= Christy Jenkins =

Fictional character from the American television supernatural drama Charmed

- Charmed character
- Marnette Patterson as Christy Jenkins
- First appearance: "Kill Billie Vol. 1" (8.06)
- Last appearance: "Forever Charmed" (8.22)
- Created by: Brad Kern
- Portrayed by: Marnette Patterson (adult); Stephanie Patton (age 11); Allie Orsatti (age 7)

In-universe information
- Full name: Christy Jenkins
- Species: Witch; Firestarter
- Gender: Female
- Title: The Key to the Ultimate Power
- Family: Carl and Helen Jenkins (parents; deceased); Billie Jenkins (younger sister)
- Notable powers: Telepathy; Pyrokinesis

Christy Jenkins is a fictional character from the American television supernatural drama Charmed, which aired on The WB Television Network (The WB) from 1998 to 2006. The character was created by executive producer Brad Kern and was portrayed by Marnette Patterson. Developed in response to the WB's request for a new character, Christy was originally planned to expand the show in a new direction for a possible ninth season or spin-off. It was later confirmed that all future plans for the show were cancelled following The WB's closure to launch The CW.

Introduced as Billie Jenkins's long-lost sister, she secretly collaborates with the demonic council known as the Triad with their plans to destroy the Charmed Ones. She eventually convinces Billie that the Charmed Ones are corrupt, and use their power to fulfill their own personal desires, rather than help for the greater good. Billie kills Christy in self-defense after being unable to convince her to understand the Halliwell sisters were good, and to return home with her. Throughout season eight, Christy is shown to be a powerful witch with a mastery of her powers of telepathy and pyrokinesis. She is also called the Key to the Ultimate Power due to her connection with Billie, who is prophesied to be the Ultimate Power. Christy is referenced in canonical Charmed material such as comic books and novels.

Christy has received mixed commentary from critics—much of it relating to her storyline with Billie, which was compared to those from previous seasons. Her role as a villain received positive attention, while Patterson's acting was criticized as exaggerated. The exact nature of Christy's morality and her status as the season's antagonist have been the subject of debate among television critics and the series' fans.

== Development ==
=== Creation and casting ===
The WB Television Network (The WB) renewed Charmed for an eighth season on condition that it incorporated new characters that could either sustain a ninth season or lead to a spin-off series. The WB reached this decision after the show's three lead actors Alyssa Milano, Holly Marie Combs, and Rose McGowan choose to not renew their contracts for future seasons. Executive producer Brad Kern scripted the sisterhood between Christy and Billie Jenkins as a way to preserve the series' focus on family. Kern said the inclusion of Patterson and Cuoco as Christy and Billie Jenkins was done to "take the series out the way it began" through a focus on sisters. In an interview with Starry Constellation Magazine, Marnette Patterson said she enjoyed the opportunity to join an established series and be featured in its finale. She added that she had an instant chemistry with her co-star Kaley Cuoco.

During The WB's merge with United Paramount Network (UPN) to form the CW Television Network (The CW) in 2006, network executives announced that there was not enough room in the schedule for a Charmed spin-off. Cuoco confirmed that a spin-off involving her character would not be developed during an interview with E!'s Kristin Veitch, and said "Charmed is done". Following the show's cancellation, Brian Krause, who played Leo Wyatt, expressed confusion over the direction of its final season. He questioned the decision to prominently feature Patterson and Cuoco, stating: "I don't know if they were trying to groom talent to go on to something else".

=== Characterization ===
Developed as a recurring character, Christy has been noted as a "source of fandom controversy" over the exact definition of her morality. When discussing Christy's kidnapping and subsequent imprisonment by demons, Kern raised the question of whether or not she was experiencing a form of Stockholm syndrome. He cited the nature versus nurture debate as one of the factors behind the development of the character. Kern said the character returned to: "[a question] we've played with and toyed with and worked every way possible over the last eight years, and [for the finale] we would like to return to it."

Even though Kern intended for the character's morality to be left ambiguous and to the viewer's interpretation, a majority of television commentators characterized Christy as an antagonist. Brittany Spanos of Vulture.com determined that Christy was an evil witch due to her betrayal of Billie and the Charmed Ones, and SpoilerTV's Gavin Hetherington identified her as the season's big bad. In their book The Book of Three, authors Diana G. Gallagher and Paul Ruditis wrote that she served as the Triad's protégée. Ruditis followed this up in a later interview by calling Christy a pawn under the control of the Triad rather than a proper villain; he found that the series lacked a strong, female antagonist.

=== Powers ===
Christy is the older of Carl and Helen Jenkins's two daughters. Both of her parents are mortal, and her powers were inherited from her maternal grandmother, making her a carrier of the genes determining magical ability. As a witch, Christy possesses the basic ability to cast spells, perform rituals, brew potions, scry for lost people or objects through the use of a crystal pendant, and communicate with the dead.

Christy also possesses an advanced form of telepathy, enabling her to hear and project her thoughts, as well as channeling other magical creatures' powers. Carl and Helen Jenkins (David Starzyk and Barbara Niven) said Christy heard voices prior to her kidnapping, implying that this power was already active. As a firestarter, Christy had the power of pyrokinesis; this power could be augmented by Billie's projection powers to vanquish demons previously believed to be invincible. Christy was identified as the Key to the Ultimate Power due to her relationship with Billie. Demain of Television Without Pity compared Christy to Buffy the Vampire Slayer character Dawn Summers as they were both referenced as the Key.

== Appearances ==
=== Television ===
As a child, Christy was kidnapped by a demon called Reinhardt (Brian Oerly) as part of a plan by the demonic council known as the Triad (Steven J. Oliver, Søren Oliver, and Leland Crooke) to destroy the Charmed Ones: Piper Halliwell (Holly Marie Combs), Phoebe Halliwell (Alyssa Milano), and Paige Matthews (Rose McGowan). Prior to her abduction, the Triad sent the demon Dumain (Anthony Cistaro) to pose as Christy's imaginary friend and corrupt her. It is implied that Christy had some awareness about the Triad as her parents found the council's symbol on the final page of her diary. During the fifteen years of her kidnapping, Christy is taught to believe that it is her destiny to unite with her sister Billie Jenkins (Kaley Cuoco) and stop the Charmed Ones since they have become corrupted by their selfish desires. After gaining the power to warp reality, Billie travels back in time to speak with an 11-year-old Christy, and tracks down her location. She rescues Christy off-screen between the episodes "12 Angry Zen" and "The Last Temptation of Christy".

With the Halliwells' help, Billie attempts to help Christy reintegrate back into everyday life and to gain control over her powers. Billie and the Halliwells are unaware of Christy's collaboration with the Triad. The Triad identifies Billie as the Ultimate Power, which was foreshadowed in earlier episodes as the season's big bad, and refers to Christy as the key to unlocking Billie's power. The Triad arranges for Christy's parents to be killed by a pair of Noxon demons (John Rosenfeld and David S. Lee), believing prolonged contact with them could sway her morality to the side of good. Billie becomes angry by the Halliwell sisters when they decide to interrogate the demons to gather more information about the Ultimate Power rather than killing them to avenge her parents' deaths. Christy uses Billie's feeling of betrayal to turn her against the Charmed Ones. Billie and Christy vanquish the Noxon demons, who were previously believed to be invincible, and the Halliwell sisters realize that Billie is the Ultimate Power.

Christy attempts to convince Billie that the Charmed Ones only use their powers for their own personal gain rather than to support the greater good; however, Billie expresses doubts about whether or not it is really their destiny to stop the Charmed Ones. Billie agrees with Christy's plans to kill the Halliwells after exploring the sisters' dreams and believing their "inner-truths" were driven by selfish desires. After turning the magical community against the Halliwells, Billie and Christy engage in the ultimate battle with the sisters, which destroys the Halliwell Manor and kills Christy, Phoebe, and Paige. Billie uses her projection power to travel back in time to save Christy, and discovers that she knowingly works with the Triad. She questions Christy's morality, and reunites with the Halliwell sisters to help them defeat the Triad. Christy and Dumain steal the cupid Coop's (Victor Webster) ring to travel back in time to warn the Triad about the outcome of the ultimate battle. Billie helps the sisters project back in time to vanquish the Triad and the past and present versions of Dumain. Billie unsuccessfully attempts to convince Christy to come back home with her. Christy refuses and throws a fireball at Billie and the Halliwell sisters; Billie telekinetically deflects it back at her and kills her.

=== Literature ===
Christy is referenced in the comic books and novels based on Charmed. In the novel Trickery Treat (2007), Paige experiences guilt over her inability to prevent the massacre of the magic community instigated by Christy. Leo is also shown as still coping with Christy's betrayal. He keeps a scorch mark left by Christy on one of the manor's walls as a reminder to Piper that the house is no longer a "danger-free zone", and that she is not invincible. In the Charmed: Season 9 issue "The Heavens Can Wait", Prue Halliwell reveals that Billie and Christy were not destined to be powerful enough to confront the Charmed Ones. She explains that her bond to the Charmed Ones prophecy, extending even after her death, restricted her sisters from reaching their true powers and made them vulnerable to the Triad's plot with Billie and Christy.

== Reception ==
Television critics have expressed differing opinions about Christy's story arc with Billie. DVD Talk's Jeffrey Robinson felt that Billie and Christy were the strongest parts of the season, and Sheldon Wiebe of the entertainment website Eclipsemagazine.com regarded the characters as re-establishing a "dark undercurrent" reminiscent of the show's first and second seasons. Shawn S. Lealos of CHUD.com agreed that Billie and Christy's story was the highlight of the season, but asserted that more screen-time should have been given to properly develop Christy's character.

Christy's role as a villain has been widely praised by television commentators, though Patterson's performance was the subject of negative criticism. Spanos placed Christy as number three on its list of 161 of the series' antagonist as rated by scariness. Demain praised Christy as an interesting character following the reveal that she was secretly working for the Triad. Gavin Hetherington, on the other hand, wrote he was indifferent about Christy, and found Billie to be the stronger character of the two. The story arc was criticized by Digital Spy's Hugh Armitage, who felt it was weakened by Patterson's "habit of pulling 'evil' faces when no one could see her like a pantomime villain". Jon Langmead of PopMatters summarized Patterson's acting as "huff[ing] and puff[ing] through her on-camera time".

Critics have commented that Christy was a sign of the show's declining quality. Christy and Billie were identified as one of the eight things that derailed the series by Armitage, who called them "the gruesome twosome". Hetherington opined that the Jenkins sisters were disappointing villains for the show's final season compared to Gideon (Gildart Jackson) and Zankou (Oded Fehr) from season six and season seven respectively. Langmead regarded the familial relationship as weaker than those already explored by the show.
