= Billie Jenkins =

Fictional character from the American television supernatural drama Charmed

- Charmed character
- Kaley Cuoco as Billie Jenkins
- First appearance: "Still Charmed & Kicking" (8.01)
- Last appearance: "Tribunal and Tribulations" (10.18)
- Created by: Brad Kern
- Portrayed by: Kaley Cuoco (adult); Hollis Robinson (age 5)

In-universe information
- Species: Witch
- Gender: Female
- Title: The Ultimate Power
- Occupation: College student
- Family: Carl and Helen Jenkins (parents; deceased); Christy Jenkins (older sister; deceased)
- Notable powers: Telekinesis; Projection

Billie Jenkins is a fictional character who appeared in the American television supernatural drama Charmed, which aired on The WB from 1998 to 2006. The character was created by executive producer Brad Kern and was portrayed by Kaley Cuoco. Billie was developed in response to The WB's request for a new character, and was intended to expand the show in a new direction for a possible ninth season or a spin-off series, leading to mixed opinions of media outlets.

Billie was introduced as a novice witch seeking training from the series' protagonists Piper Halliwell (Holly Marie Combs), Phoebe Halliwell (Alyssa Milano), and Paige Matthews (Rose McGowan). Her storylines focus on her search for her missing sister Christy Jenkins (Marnette Patterson) and their eventual reunion. She gains the ability to warp reality through the power of projection and is revealed as the "Ultimate Power". Christy and the demonic council known as the Triad manipulates Billie into believing the Charmed Ones are corrupted by their powers but when the truth is revealed, she eventually reconnects with the Halliwells. The character also makes further canonical appearances in the comic books Charmed: Season 9 and Charmed: Season 10 as a friend to the sisters and is referenced in one of the novels.

Critical response to Billie was mixed; some critics felt that she was a strong addition to Charmed while others cited Cuoco's acting and the character's story arc with Christy as signs of the show's declining quality. After speculation about Billie's possible appearance in a spin-off series, it was confirmed all plans for the show were canceled in The WB's transition to The CW. Cuoco later stated that she prefers working on sitcoms over dramatic television shows due to Charmed's demanding shooting schedule.

== Development ==
=== Casting and filming ===
When renewing Charmed for its eighth season, the WB required the show to introduce new characters to either sustain an additional season or lead a potential spin-off; the lead actors Holly Marie Combs, Alyssa Milano, and Rose McGowan did not renew their contracts for further episodes. According to Pam Shae, the executive-in-charge of talent, the casting call for Billie called for a young, female actor who would appeal to the WB executives. When discussing the casting process, Kaley Cuoco described Billie as solely based on her physical appearance, saying: "I think they just wanted a blonde on the show." During an interview for the ten year anniversary of the series finale, executive producer Brad Kern clarified Billie was intended to "lighten the load, screen-time wise" for the three principal actors and "bring new blood to an aging show". He felt Cuoco's presence and comedic timing worked well with Combs, Milano, and McGowan. When describing the introduction of Christy Jenkins, played by Marnette Patterson, Kern said he wanted to end Charmed by returning to its initial focus on sisterhood.

Billie was Cuoco's first role in a television drama series. Cuoco stated she felt comfortable working with the other actors and felt she was part of the show since its beginning, noting the warm reception from the cast and crew. Patterson said she had "instant chemistry" with Cuoco and that their connection made acting out their storyline easier. During The WB's merge with United Paramount Network (UPN) to form The CW in 2006, network executives said there was not enough room for a Charmed spin-off. In an interview with E!'s Kristin Veitch, Cuoco confirmed a spin-off involving her character would not be developed, saying "Charmed is done" and that she preferred to participate in other projects. Brian Krause, who played Leo Wyatt, said that he was confused at the direction of the final season, stating "I don't know if they were trying to groom talent to go on to something else".

Following the show's cancellation, Cuoco said that she preferred working sitcoms rather than dramas. She felt the "18-hour days where you want to kill yourself" did not leave her with enough time to have a life outside of work and the demanding shooting schedule did not allow her enough time to work with Combs, Milano, and McGowan. Cuoco also said she only understood her performance on the show after watching the final cuts of the episodes with the special effects and animations; she explained: "But when you are working, you are waiting and waiting and then things are invisible and things are being thrown, and nothing's in your hand, and I'm like so confused and always asking everyone, 'What's happening?'".

Cuoco described the character's wardrobe as "cute and fun", and felt that it matched her own personal style. However, she did take issue with the outfits used for the character's magical transformations. She cried when she first saw her superhero costume for the season eight episode "Battle of the Hexes", which originally included a cape. A writer from WE tv listed Billie's superhero look as one of the show's "sexiest and most bizarre outfits". Cuoco said that she also disliked the black vinyl outfit and wig that she wore during her first two episodes.

=== Characterization and powers ===
For her early appearances on the series, Billie was identified as the Charmed Ones' protégée. Cuoco viewed Billie as a "little sister" to the Halliwell sisters, and attributed her as "very naive and always getting in trouble". Co-executive producer James L. Conway believed Billie's identity as a novice witch added a new dynamic to the show, while Pam Shae called the character "demanding", "spunky", and "very, very confident" despite her inexperience with magic. Keri Blakinger of New York Daily News felt that Billie developed into a "powerful witch in her own right" over the course of the season.

Billie is the younger of Carl and Helen Jenkins's two daughters. Both of her parents are mortal and her powers were inherited from her maternal grandmother, making Helen a carrier of the genes determining magical ability. Billie has the basic abilities of a witch, including casting spells, performing rituals, brewing potions, scrying for lost people or objects using of a crystal pendant, and communicating with the dead. She also has the power of telekinesis and later develops the ability to warp reality using a power known as projection. She is shown mastering her original powers very easily and adapting them using unconventional methods, such as attaching a large quartz crystal to her computer's mouse to scry through a GPS system. Her telekinesis enables her to perform acrobatic moves, such as backflips. She experiences difficulty using her power of projection due to her fear of hurting others. Billie eventually masters this power, and by the series finale she can easily travel through time.

=== Rumored reboot and reunion ===
On October 25, 2013, it was announced CBS, which owns Spelling Television's properties, was developing a reboot of Charmed. Kate Ward of Bustle connected CBS's decision to revisit the supernatural drama with Cuoco's success as "one of the network's most bankable stars" for her role on the sitcom The Big Bang Theory. On August 12, 2014, TVLine's Michael Ausiello announced CBS would not proceed with the reboot.

In an interview with Entertainment Tonight, Milano alluded to the possibility of a Charmed reunion and said; "It seems like that's going to happen any second". Glenn Garner of Out magazine said Cuoco's character should be excluded from the possible reunion. Bustle's Sabienna Bowman wrote the reunion should address Billie's fate following the series finale, arguing the character's future should be "more interesting than babysitting for the Halliwell brood". While Shannen Doherty and McGowan publicly supported the idea of a reunion, Dan Avery of NewNowNext.com wondered whether Cuoco had been asked to revisit her role as Billie. On March 5, 2016, Milano said there were no concrete plans for a reunion in development, but confirmed CBS was still in the process of producing a reboot without the original cast.

== Appearances ==
=== Television ===
Billie first appears in the season eight premiere "Still Charmed & Kicking" as a college student who hunts and vanquishes demons while disguised in a black wig and a vinyl outfit. Billie subconsciously calls out to whitelighter Paige Matthews (Rose McGowan) for help. Paige's sisters Piper Halliwell (Holly Marie Combs) and Phoebe Halliwell (Alyssa Milano) initially discourage Paige from contacting Billie to prevent the discovery of their faked deaths and assumption of new identities, which they did so they could live free of magic. Billie later falls into an Alice's Adventures in Wonderland-themed trap set up by demons Paul Haas (Mykel Shannon Jenkins) and Black Heart (Noa Tishby), who were attempting to lure the Charmed Ones out of hiding and prove they were still alive. The Halliwell sisters save Billie from the demons' illusions and agree to train her; they agree she will fight demons for them and keep their secret. Billie's passion for using magic to save innocent people inspires the Halliwell sisters to reclaim their old identities and resume their responsibilities as the Charmed Ones.

On Halloween, Billie tells the Halliwells her older sister Christy Jenkins (Marnette Patterson) was kidnapped by a demon 15 years prior. Billie's memories are rekindled when she is finding the location of a demon named Dogan (Eric Steinberg) and recognizes similarities between him and Christy's kidnapper. After this revelation, Billie's storylines focus on her search for her sister; the Halliwells worry about Billie becoming obsessed with finding Christy as she takes more risks to get information, such as interrogating and torturing demons. Billie accuses her parents of choosing to forget Christy rather than trying to locate her. Billie's mother Helen (Barbara Niven) gives her Christy's diary, in which Billie finds a pentagram on the last page. The pentagram is a symbol for the demonic council known as Triad (Steven J. Oliver, Seren Oliver, and Leland Crooke). She eventually gains enough control over her powers to travel to the past, speak to Christy, and find her location.

Billie rescues Christy off-screen between the episodes "12 Angry Zen" and "The Last Temptation of Christy". With the Halliwells' help, she attempts to help Christy reintegrate into everyday life and gain control over her powers. Unbeknown to Billie, Christy has been brainwashed by the Triad and has been instructed to turn her against the Halliwell sisters. At this time, Billie is identified as the "Ultimate Power" foreshadowed in earlier episodes as the season's "big bad". The Triad arranges for Billie's parents to be killed by demons (John Rosenfeld and David S. Lee), believing Christy's prolonged contact with them could sway her morality to the side of good. Billie feels betrayed by the Halliwell sisters when they interrogate the demons about the "Ultimate Power" rather than killing them to avenge her parents' deaths. Billie and Christy vanquish the demons and the Halliwell sisters realize Billie is the "Ultimate Power".

During this time, the Halliwell sisters and the Jenkins sisters turn against one another. Christy attempts to persuade Billie the Charmed Ones use their powers for personal gain rather than to support the greater good. Billie eventually agrees with Christy's plans to kill the Halliwells. After turning the magical community against the Halliwells, Billie and Christy battle with the sisters. The confrontation ends with the destruction of the Halliwell Manor and the deaths of Christy, Phoebe, and Paige. Billie uses her powers of projection to travel back in time to save Christy and discovers her manipulation by the Triad. Billie helps the sisters project themselves into the past to vanquish the Triad and unsuccessfully try to persuade Christy to return home with Billie. Christy throws a fireball at Billie and the Halliwell sisters, forcing Billie to telekinetically deflect it back at her and kill her. In the flashforward ending sequence, Billie is shown babysitting Phoebe's two oldest daughters and is referenced as an "old friend" by Phoebe, implying that she regained the Halliwell sisters' trust.

=== Literature ===
Billie also appears in a novel and a series of comic books based on the television series Charmed. The narrator of "Trickery Treat", which takes place after the eighth season, describes Billie as "[a]n above-average white witch" and the Halliwell sisters' protégée and friend. In Charmed: Season 9 #5 ("Unnatural Resources"), Paige collects magic from Billie in an effort to vanquish the Source of All Evil. Paige refers to Billie as the second line of defense if the sisters fail to kill the Source, and asks her to protect Darryl Morris (Dorian Gregory) and his family. The comic book issue is about Billie's life after the ultimate battle; she moves from San Francisco to Los Angeles to finish college. In issue 16, Prue Halliwell reveals her bond to the Charmed Ones' prophecy even after death restricts her sisters from achieving their true powers, which made them vulnerable to the Triad's plot with Billie and Christy. In Charmed: Season 10, Billie is said to have called the sisters during their battle with a race of powerful, evil demons known as the Old Ones. Later, Phoebe attempts to call Billie for help after having a premonition of her husband Coop being attacked by Prue, but could not make contact with her.

== Reception ==
Billie has received mixed critical responses following her inclusion in Charmed's final season. Cuoco was described as a "good addition to the cast" by a writer for the DVD review website CurrentFilm.com, and she was praised by CHUD.com's Shawn S. Lealos as a "strong lead on a show already dominated by three very strong actresses". Lealos felt that the Billie and Christy story arc was the highlight of the eighth season, but believed it was not given enough time to fully develop. DVD Talk's Jeffrey Robinson also wrote that Billie and Christy were the strongest aspects of the final season. The characters were interpreted by Sheldon Wiebe of the entertainment website Eclipsemagazine.com as re-establishing a "dark undercurrent" reminiscent of the show's first and second seasons. Digital Spy's Hugh Armitage, on the other hand, viewed Billie as an example of Cousin Oliver Syndrome, a phrase referring to the addition of a younger character to improve declining ratings. Ryan Keefer of DVD Verdict was critical of the addition of the character, writing: "If it hadn't already been established that this was the last season, this event would have sealed the cancellation deal". Billie was mocked by Demain of Television Without Pity throughout his recaps of the show's eighth season.

Television critics responded negatively to Cuoco's performance as Billie. Wiebe was critical of Cuoco's acting, specifically in the series finale, and Robinson argued that Cuoco did not provide a strong representation of her character and was over-exaggerated in her performance. Jon Langmead of PopMatters viewed Cuoco as unable to "generate any kind of life with her character" and found that her "awkward presence and acting call[ed] attention to the show’s weaknesses when in the past, the cast was able to distract from them". Demain responded negatively to the introduction of Cuoco during his recap on her first appearance in the series.

Critics have commented that Billie was a sign of the show's declining quality. Christy and Billie were identified as one of the eight things that derailed the series by Armitage, who called them "the gruesome twosome". SpoilerTV's Gavin Hetherington opined that the Jenkins sisters were disappointing villains for the show's final season compared to Gideon (Gildart Jackson) and Zankou (Oded Fehr) from season six and season seven respectively. Langmead regarded the familial relationship between Billie and Christy as weaker than those already explored by the show.
