= Paige Matthews =

Fictional character from the American television supernatural drama Charmed

- Charmed character
- First appearance: "Charmed Again (Part 1)" (4.01)
- Last appearance: The Reason (10.20)
- Created by: Brad Kern
- Portrayed by: Rose McGowan

In-universe information
- Alias: Jo Bennett
- Species: Charmed One; Witch; Whitelighter
- Family: Mr. and Mrs. Matthews (adoptive parents; deceased); Patty Halliwell (biological mother; deceased); Sam Wilder (biological father; deceased); Prue Halliwell (oldest maternal half-sister; deceased); Piper Halliwell (older maternal half-sister); Phoebe Halliwell (older maternal half-sister)
- Spouses: Henry Mitchell (2006–present)
- Children: Tamora Mitchell (comic book series); Kat Mitchell (comic book series); Henry Mitchell Jr (comic book series)
- Relatives: Charlotte Warren (ancestor; deceased); Melinda Warren (ancestor; deceased) unknown names (adoptive grandparents); Allen Halliwell (biological maternal grandfather; deceased); Penny Halliwell (biological maternal grandmother; deceased); 6 Half-niblings
- Notable powers: Telekinetic Orbing; Orb Shield; Whitelighter powers

Paige Matthews (née Halliwell) is a fictional character from the American television series Charmed, played by Rose McGowan from October 4, 2001, until May 21, 2006. The character was created by executive producer Brad Kern as a replacement for lead character Prue Halliwell, following the departure of actress Shannen Doherty. Paige is introduced into season four as the fiercely independent younger half-sister of the female leads, Prue (Shannen Doherty), Piper (Holly Marie Combs) and Phoebe Halliwell (Alyssa Milano). Like her sisters, Paige is a witch and more specifically, a Charmed One—one of the most powerful witches of all time. Paige is introduced as the secret love child of the Halliwell sisters' mother Patty (Finola Hughes) and her whitelighter (guardian angel) Sam Wilder (Scott Jaeck), making Paige both a witch and whitelighter. She was given up at birth and raised by her adoptive parents, Mr. and Mrs. Matthews.

At the beginning of season four, Paige goes on to help reconstitute The Charmed Ones by taking Prue's place in the "Power of Three", following her death in the season three finale. Like Prue, Paige possesses telekinetic abilities, but due to her mixed whitelighter heritage, this manifests as the ability to orb ("teleport") objects from one location to another through a vocal command. As the series progresses, Paige also receives whitelighter abilities such as the power to orb herself and others, as well as sensing, glamouring and healing also the power of photokinesis. Paige's storylines have often revolved around her protecting innocents and defeating the forces of evil in San Francisco with her sisters. In the later seasons, she eventually receives her own whitelighter charges to train and protect as they learn witchcraft. Paige also has romantic relationships with fellow-witch Richard Montana (Balthazar Getty) in season six and FBI agent Kyle Brody (Kerr Smith) in season seven. In the eighth and final season, Paige marries a human parole officer named Henry Mitchell (Ivan Sergei).

The character was mostly well received by television critics, who complimented Paige's personality and felt that McGowan was the right choice for the role. McGowan won the Family Television Award for Favorite Sister in 2005 for her portrayal of Paige. In 2007, AOL TV ranked Paige at number 13 on their list of the Top TV Witches, the lowest of the four sisters. In addition to the television series, the character has also appeared in numerous expanded universe material, such as the Charmed novels and its comic book adaptation.

== Casting and development ==
The character of Paige Matthews was conceived by executive producer Brad Kern as a replacement character for Prue Halliwell (Shannen Doherty). In May 2001, it was officially announced that Doherty would be departing Charmed. The producers originally considered recasting the role of Prue with a different actress. Executive producer Aaron Spelling even approached actresses Tiffani Thiessen, who replaced Doherty on his previous series Beverly Hills, 90210 and Jennifer Love Hewitt to take on the role as Doherty's replacement. Spelling revealed to Entertainment Weekly, "Tiffani was our first choice to take over for Shannen - even before we asked Jennifer [Love Hewitt], but Tiffani told us she wants to do a half-hour comedy." Hewitt also declined the role. Producers then decided to kill off the character of Prue and replace her with a long-lost younger sister in favor of having "a fresh face" join the series. Spelling stated, "[The character's] going to be the long-lost sister Alyssa and Holly never knew [they] had. And wait until you see what we came up with to explain why she's been lost: Nobody ever knew she even existed."

Film actress Rose McGowan was later revealed to be cast in the role of Paige Matthews, her first role as a series regular on a television series. Kern stated, "From Paige's point of view, you go to bed one night and you think you're a single child and no one understands you. Then you wake up the next morning and you find out you've got sisters who are witches, who've got supernatural powers, who have a destiny that you must now share and embrace and you must learn your new powers." He later elaborated saying, "When we meet her, she will have been searching for many years, both for her birth parents, but also for an answer to that feeling that she's had inside of her that there's something special, there's something else that nobody has yet been able to understand and explain." On casting McGowan in the role of Paige, Kern admitted, "Our personal hope was to find somebody that would be of Shannen's calibre, that would have the sexiness, the edge and the range. That, for the age range we were looking for, is hard to find. We said, 'We don't want somebody conventional. We don't want a shrinking violet. We don't want just another pretty face that smiles and has great teeth. We want somebody who has an attitude.' I think Rose definitely has an attitude and that's an energy that we can take advantage of for the betterment of the show."

== Appearances ==
=== Television ===
Paige appears as the secret half-sister in the final five seasons of Charmed, portrayed by Rose McGowan within 112 episodes from 2001 to 2006. In the episode "Charmed Again", it is revealed that after Paige's adoptive parents (played by Lisa Darr and M. Scott Wilkinson) died, she went searching for her birth parents and suspected that she might be related to the Halliwell sisters. With Patty Halliwell (Finola Hughes) long since deceased, Paige relented on pursuing the matter further. After the Source of All Evil learns of Paige's existence, he orders her killed. Paige is eventually saved by Phoebe Halliwell (Alyssa Milano) and her boyfriend Cole Turner (Julian McMahon) and then subsequently introduced to Piper Halliwell (Holly Marie Combs) and her husband Leo Wyatt (Brian Krause). Paige then goes on to help reconstitute The Charmed Ones by taking Prue Halliwell's (Shannen Doherty) place in "The Power of Three". This is made possible after it is revealed that she is the daughter of Patty and the Whitelighter Sam Wilder (Scott Jaeck), making her a "sister-witch" to Phoebe and Piper. The episode reveals that Paige was given up at birth to protect her from the wrath of The Elders if they were to discover her Whitelighter heritage.

Like her sister Prue, Paige was born with "the ability to move things with her mind". Since she possessed the missing power, she was able to take her place in the Power of Three, thus reforming the Charmed Ones. Due to her Whitelighter heritage, however, her magical method of movement causes "objects to orb from a location to another". Paige has also shown the ability to impart momentum on these orbing objects. Throughout season four, Paige shows that she has inherited a variety of Whitelighter powers such as orbing, and sensing. While Paige finds it easier to develop a friendship with Phoebe, she initially butts heads with Piper, but eventually the two sisters develop a mutual respect.

Later in the season, Paige reveals her identity as a witch to her childhood friend and "sometimes" boyfriend, Glen Belland (Jesse Woodrow). Once she develops more control over her witchcraft Paige is able to help her sisters' avenge Prue's death and vanquish the Source twice – both in his original incarnation and that of his next incarnation, Cole Turner. During the finale of season four, Paige and her sisters are visited by the Angel of Destiny (Dakin Matthews), who offers them the chance to live normal lives without magical powers or the threat of demons. Over the course of the episode, Paige eventually convinces her sisters to decline the offer and remain Charmed to continue doing good in the world.

At the start of season five (2002–2003), Paige is officially promoted to social worker in the episode, "A Witch's Tail (Part 1)", but by the end of the second episode, "A Witch's Tail (Part 2)", Paige quits her job to pursue being a witch full-time. During this season Paige meets Sam Wilder (her birth-father) and slowly comes to terms with letting him into her life. Meanwhile, she struggles with living up to the legend of her deceased half-sister Prue and her title of "Superwitch". When Paige masters a difficult spell created by Prue, she appears to come at peace with her sibling rivalry. Later in the season, Paige, alongside Phoebe, trains to be a midwife in order to deliver Piper's baby. When Piper gives birth to a boy she names Wyatt, she also gives him the middle name Matthew in honor of his aunt Paige.

In the sixth season (2003–2004), Paige grows tired of unemployment and obtains a job at a temp agency. While employed on the various jobs via the agency, Paige finds herself drawn into various magical endeavors concerning members of the magical community. Through one of these magical journeys she meets and later dates a witch named Richard Montana (Balthazar Getty), a relationship which mirrors the love affair Phoebe had with Cole as Richard attempts to avoid the temptations of dark magic. The couple eventually break up, but not before Paige binds Richard's powers so that he doesn't feel the temptation to misuse his powers.

Also in this season, Paige becomes the second person to discover that the sisters' new time-traveling Whitelighter Chris Perry (Drew Fuller) is actually Chris Halliwell and the second child of Piper and Leo. He has come back in time to prevent Wyatt from becoming evil in the future. Together, Chris helps Paige and her sisters discover that a powerful Elder named Gideon (Gildart Jackson) wishes to destroy the Twice-Blessed Wyatt, an act which causes Wyatt to turn his back on good in the future.

During the start of the seventh season (2004–2005), Paige fights to keep Magic School from closing after the death of its headmaster, Gideon. The Elders then place Paige in charge of Magic School as the new headmistress once they realize how deep her dedication runs. Also this season, Paige befriends federal agent Kyle Brody (Kerr Smith), and the two eventually grow close over their mutual investigation of The Avatars, powerful beings who are neither good nor evil. After initial hesitation, Paige and her sisters join sides with The Avatars in their plan to turn the world into a utopia against the warnings of both Kyle and The Elders. When The Charmed Ones discover that the new utopia robs the world of their free will, they join sides with Kyle and the demon Zankou (Oded Fehr) and force The Avatars to restore the world to normal. Kyle, however, is killed in the process, but is resurrected as a Whitelighter as a reward from The Elders for helping to defeat The Avatars. He says his goodbyes to Paige, before leaving to start his new life.

In late season seven, in episode seventeen "Scry Hard", Paige grows tired of being cooped up in Magic School and desires a reprieve from her duties as headmistress. At the suggestion of Piper and Phoebe, Paige instates the now human Leo as the new headmaster of Magic School in her place so that she can take a break while Leo can work in a place safe from the harm of demon attacks. The following episode, "Little Box of Horrors", The Elders manage to convince Paige that her continued quest for a life outside her role as a Charmed One stems from her destiny as a future Whitelighter. In the episode "Freaky Phoebe", Paige takes on official Whitelighter duties and gains her first charge in a witch named Mitchell Haines (Seamus Dever) who has the power of superhuman speed. In the season seven finale, during a suicide mission to vanquish Zankou, Paige and her sisters fake their deaths in order to escape the constant threat of demon attacks as well as police and government investigations.

In the eighth and final season (2005–2006), Paige takes on the false identity of Jo Bennett (Christina Ulloa) and attempts to live a normal life free of magic. This proves to be impossible, as Paige hears the continual call of a new charge, a telekinetic witch named Billie Jenkins (Kaley Cuoco). In the fifth episode of season eight, "Rewitched", Paige and her sisters reclaim their true identities with the help of federal agent Murphy (Brandon Quinn) in exchange for helping the FBI handle supernatural investigations.

Episode eight, "Battle of the Hexes", introduces Paige to parole officer Henry Mitchell (Ivan Sergei). After a courtship, which involves Henry discovering Paige's secret identity as a witch and whitelighter, the couple get married in the episode "Engaged and Confused". Later in the season, Paige discovers that her charge Billie and her sister, Christy Jenkins (Marnette Patterson) are the ultimate power The Charmed Ones must defeat to save Leo from the Angel of Death (Simon Templeman), but she has reservations because the women are human and not demons. In the end, Paige willingly participates in the ultimate battle between The Charmed Ones and the Jenkins sisters. After the series end, it is shown in flashforwards that Paige accepts her role as a Whitelighter, aiding many witches and future Whitelighters that include her nieces and nephews. It is also revealed that Paige and Henry's marriage will produce three children, twin daughters and a son.

=== Literature ===
As one of the central characters of the series, Paige appears in a number of Charmed literature. These appearances first began in the eleventh book of the series of novels. The novels follow no strict continuity with the series or each other and are often considered to be non-canon. However, the television series producers have final approval of everything in the novels, which could indicate the literature fitting into the established canon of the series and the so-called "Charmed universe". Paige's first appearance in Charmed literature takes place within the novel Charmed Again by Elizabeth Lenhard in 2002, which acts as a novelised version of the fourth season premiere episode. Her last appearance in a Charmed novel takes place within Trickery Treat by Diana G. Gallagher on January 1, 2008.

In 2010, Charmed gained an officially licensed continuation in the form of a comic book, which is often billed as Charmed: Season 9. The series is published monthly by Zenescope Entertainment. Set eighteen-months after the series finale, the sisters are seen living happy demon free lives and have each entered into motherhood. Paige has had twin girls with Henry Mitchell named Kat and Tamora Mitchell. In the comic series, Paige is working as a full-time Whitelighter and can also be seen helping Leo at Magic School with his students. In Issue #3, Innocents Lost, Paige develops a new power in the form of a reinforced forcefield made up of orbs. Later in Issue #8, Oh, Henry, Paige rescues a baby from the womb of his dying mother. She and Henry later adopt the infant boy and name him Henry, Jr. In the seventeenth issue of the comics, Paige looks for a witch named Sarah at a Salem house; however, she meets Cole who won't let her in. Despite his pleas, she orbs into the house where she meets Prudence (Prue) and the two touch causing their powers to send them away. After recovering, Patience tells Paige that she is Prue. At first, Paige doesn't believe her, but they go to the manor where after six years, Prue, Piper and Phoebe are finally reunited with a hug.

== Powers and abilities ==
=== Witch abilities ===
In Charmed it is revealed that magical witches can develop and master a variety of magical skills and powers which include; scrying, spell casting, and brewing potent potions. As a magical witch Paige can utilize scrying, a divination art form that allows one to locate a missing object or person. Paige can also cast spells, often written in iambic pentameter or as a rhyming couplet, to influence others or the world around her. She can also brew potions, most often used to vanquish foes or to achieve other magical feats similar to the effects of a spell. As a witch and Charmed One, Paige has also developed a number of magical powers which include Telekinetic Orbing and Force Field (sometimes called Orb Shield).

==== Telekinetic Orbing ====
In the second half of the two-part season four premiere, "Charmed Again (Part 2)", Paige displays her method of moving objects with her mind by teleporting objects from one location to another through a vocal command. When she vocally calls the name of an object or living being it will orb to her, appearing in hand or within close range to her body. This power is sometimes labeled Telekinetic Orbing. Due to her Whitelighter side, Paige's telekinetic power carries aspects of teleportation, although she still showcases the ability to impart momentum on the objects she orbs allowing her to throw them across distances. Telekinetic Orbing does not require a great deal of accuracy in calling an object. For instance, in the season six episode "Hyde School Reunion", Paige orbs demonic acid by using the vocal call, "Icky stuff". She also displays the lack of need for accuracy in the episode "A Wrong Day's Journey into Right" when she redirects a shuriken by calling out, "Weapon...thingy."

Over the course of her time on the series, Paige's powers grow in strength allowing her to move things without verbally calling for them. This can be seen in the episode, "Sword and the City" when she orbs the stoned encased Excalibur into the attic of the Manor without a vocal command. She shows this skill again in the season eight episode "Repo Manor" when she orbs the replica dollhouse of the Manor into the attic without saying anything as well. By late season seven, it becomes evident that Paige can now orb people and demons to any location by saying the name of the desired location. For example, she orbs Phoebe back to the Manor by stating, "Home!" in the episode "Charmed Noir". Towards the end of season eight, Paige displays the advanced skill of being able to orb and throw adult sized demons and people across distances in a similar fashion to Prue's telekinetic lift and throw method. The most prominent example of this occurs when she orbs the demon Asmodeus (Steven J. Oliver), a member of The Triad, directly into a fireball thrown by fellow Triad member Baliel (Sören Oliver). Paige also simultaneously orbs and throws two demons into a dumpster in the episode "Gone with the Witches".

==== Orb Shield ====
In the Charmed comics, specifically Issue #3, Innocents Lost, Paige develops a new power in the form of a reinforced force field made up of orbs. Paige displays the ability to encase others inside of her force fields, without being within them herself, when she uses her new power to contain the explosion caused by the resurrected Source's destruction in the tenth issue of the comic series, Three Little Wiccans. In this same issue, Paige also uses her force field power offensively to push back demons.

=== Whitelighter powers ===
In Charmed a Whitelighter is a human soul that has been made a "guardian angel" for good witches and other future Whitelighters (also known as a Whitelighter's "charge"). A Whitelighter acts in the service of The Elders who bestow these souls with their new angelic powers. Because Paige's father, Sam Wilder, is a Whitelighter, she has inherited a number of powers associated with this race of guardian angels which include Orbing, Sensing, Glamouring and Healing. Of important note is that her Whitelighter powers exist independently from her witch powers, which has proven handy in situations where her witch powers were stolen or rendered null.

==== Orbing ====
Paige enters the series with the ability to orb, a teleporting ability unique to Whitelighters that allows them to travel anywhere in the world as well as between various supernatural worlds, including the magically guarded realm of The Elders (often called "Up There" in the show). In the season four episode "A Paige from the Past", it is revealed that Paige has always had access to her power to orb, as the ability saves her from dying in the car crash that killed her adoptive parents. When we are introduced to Paige, her orbing power can only be channeled in panic induced situations as a fear response. She is also only able to orb in and out within the same place, which makes her unable to travel across distances with the power. In the season four episode "The Three Faces of Phoebe", Paige displays growth with her orbing powers by transporting herself across town for the first time. In the same episode, she also displays the advanced ability of orbing with passengers. Despite taking on the full duties of a Whitelighter by the eighth and final season of the series, Paige never shows the ability to orb "Up There". Instead, whenever she congregates with an Elder, she orbs to the top of the suspension tower of the Golden Gate Bridge to hold a meeting (though since she has successfully orbed to the Underworld on several occasions, this may have more to do with her personal attitude towards them than a lack of ability).

==== Sensing ====
In late season four, it is revealed that Paige has acquired the ability of sensing, a supernatural power which grants a Whitelighter a magical awareness of a charge's location and physical well-being. Paige's first instance of full on sensing is seen in the episode "Saving Private Leo". Paige's sensing power enables her to hear the "call" of her charges whenever they are in need, allowing her to go to them when they need her most. Before becoming a full-fledged Whitelighter, Paige displays the ability to hear her sisters' "call" when she is far away from them. As a Whitelighter, her charges must not always vocally call out to her when they are in need. The sensing power allows the Whitelighter to instantly hear a charge's inner call whenever the charge is in immediate danger, which is, more often than not, life-threatening.

==== Healing ====
Paige first shows a talent for healing in the season four premiere, "Charmed Again (Part 2)", when she uses her Whitelighter powers to enhance the healing abilities of her own Whitelighter, Leo Wyatt, to fully heal the half-demon Cole Turner. Later in that season, Paige is able to channel Leo's healing powers to heal him of his wounds after he has been poisoned by a Darklighter's arrow. However, it is not until the season eight episode "Payback's a Witch" that Paige develops the trigger to be able to heal on her own. After expressing her love discreetly for wounded parole officer Henry Mitchell, Paige unlocks the emotional trigger of love to access her healing powers, which she later uses to heal Henry of his gunshot wound. Like all Whitelighters before her, Paige can only use her healing powers on humans and not animals or demons.

=== Natural abilities ===
Paige has proven to be a skilled painter and sketch artist, first introduced in the season four episode, "Muse to My Ears". Paige also showcases her singing talents in the season five episode, "Sense and Sense Ability". While she has limited training in physical combat, her fighting skills are proficient enough to best Billie in hand-to-hand combat in the season eight episode, "Malice in Wonderland".

== Reception and cultural impact ==
CNN's Joshua Levs characterised Paige as "the lovable, secret, younger half-sister." In his review of the fourth season, Jeffrey Robinson of DVD Talk felt that Paige fits right in with the sisters and noted that her addition changed the character dynamics of Piper and Phoebe "in a good way." In another review of the fourth season, Leigh H. Edwards of PopMatters added that the addition of Paige was "contrived and clunky", but welcomed the idea of McGowan joining the show as a witch "since she has major goth cred as Marilyn Manson's former flame." DVD Verdict's Cynthia Boris wrote that McGowan brought "a youthfulness" and "a fresh viewer perspective" to Charmed, further noting that "fans have come to enjoy her presence on the show."

A writer for MovieWeb praised McGowan's performance for delivering a "great and relatable character", noting that "She gets all of Paige's own quirks and emotions and the feel of adjusting to things down really well." The writer also felt that McGowan was a "great casting choice" for Charmed. Rob Lineberger of DVD Verdict commented on McGowan's acting in the fifth season, noting that she "clips off the end of every sentence, often growling more than annunciating her lines." Lineberger also added that "McGowan's impressive snarl" was one of the reasons he enjoyed that season. In his review of the sixth season, Lineberger wrote that McGowan was "still smoking hot."

At the 2001 Wand Awards, McGowan was nominated for Best New Cast Member for her portrayal of Paige. In 2005, she won Favorite Sister at the Family Television Awards. In 2007, AOL TV ranked Paige at number 12 on their list of Top TV Witches. The following year, she was ranked at number 13 on the same list.

== See also ==
- Woman warrior
