= Charmed (comics) =

2010–2016 continuation of the television series

- The debut issue, Charmed #1 (June 2010).

Publication information
- Publisher: Zenescope Entertainment
- Schedule: Monthly
- Genre: Fantasy
- Publication date: (Season 9); June 2010 – November 2012 (Season 10); October 2014 – September 2016
- No. of issues: (Season 9): 24 (and 4 collected editions) (Season 10): 20 (and 3 collected editions)
- Main characters: Piper Halliwell; Phoebe Halliwell; Paige Matthews; Prue Halliwell other Charmed characters

Creative team
- Written by: Paul Ruditis (0-24); Raven Gregory (0-3); Pat Shand (25-44)
- Penciller: List: Dave Hoover (0–3), Marcio Abreu (4, 5 & 7), Tess Fowler (6, 11 & 19), Carlos Granda (8), Dean Kotz (9, 12, 14–18, 20 & 21), Reno Maniquis (10 & 13), Rubine (22–24), Elisa Féliz (25-29, 32-36), Daniela Di Matteo (30 & 31)
- Letterer(s): Jim Campbell (0-26); Christy Sawyer (27-36)
- Colorist(s): Milen Parvanov (1–4 & 7); John Hunt (5, 6, 8 & 24); Michael Spicer (14–17, & 19); Joshua Wentzell (18); Falk (20); Dash Martin (21–23); Valentina Cuomo (25–36)

Charmed comics were officially licensed continuations of the popular television series of the same name, which ended its eight-year run in 2006. The comic books were published monthly by Zenescope Entertainment. Charmed: Season 9 served as a continuation set eighteen months after the events of the televised show's final episode and was first released on June 16, 2010. After concluding in 2012, it was succeeded by Charmed: Season 10 which debuted on October 8, 2014 and ended on September 14, 2016. Each season comprises 22-24 issues and one story arc spans between five and seven issues which is reprinted in graphic novel form.

The comics were set in the fictional "Charmed universe" and all content was approved by CBS Consumer Products in order to adhere to the continuity of the franchise. The series narrative followed the Charmed Ones – sisters Piper and Phoebe Halliwell and Paige Matthews – the most powerful good witches in history who use their combined "Power of Three" to protect innocent lives from demonic beings. After being reunited with their late elder sister, Prue, who was killed less than a decade earlier, the four sisters vanquish the demon Rennek in order to safeguard the existence and secrecy of magic. Writers of the comics are also involved in the publication of other Charmed literature, including Paul Ruditis, author of Season 9 and editor of Season 10, whose novel The War on Witches (2015) is set between the events of the two seasons.

The comics were generally well received. One graphic novel volume made The New York Times Best Seller list in early 2011. Initially, only 12 issues were contracted by Zenescope but, due to the success of the first few issues, the contract was doubled to 24 issues per season. The first issue sold out of its initial 17,000 copies in the first three weeks, which prompted Zenescope to release a second printing in time for the release of Issue #2.

== Production ==
=== Development ===
Rumors of a comic series began long before Zenescope made the news official in March 2010. Speculation had started to appear online about the possibility of a comic series much earlier, however, largely due to test sketches appearing on the DeviantArt account of Dave Hoover which featured Holly Marie Combs, Alyssa Milano and Rose McGowan. Speaking on his DeviantArt page, Hoover said:

If everything goes according to plan I'll be working on a "Charmed" comic book based on the hit TV series published by Zenescope Entertainment. To get the job I had to compete with others vying for the same gig, and our task was to do model sheets of the girls showing how we would draw them. The art would be approved by the studio. The odd thing about this was that they supplied no photo reference, so I searched the internet high and low looking for the best possible pictures. Of the three girls, I thought Alyssa Milano would be the easiest to draw, but she turned out to be the hardest. She sort of changed her look more often than the other two, Rose McGowan and Holly Marie Combs.

— Dave Hoover, DeviantArt, March 13, 2009

Months before the title had officially been announced, and before Zenescope gained acquisition of the publication rights for the comic series, the first advertisement for the series featuring the famous triquetra symbol and the tag line "The Girls are Back" written in the series font appeared in the December 16, 2009 issue of the Zenescope comic book Escape From Wonderland #3. However, Zenescope did not officially announce possession of the title until the company had successfully been granted the rights from Fox Consumer Products.

Subsequently, the first press release from Zenescope Entertainment indicated that Charmed, based on the "ultra-popular" media franchise, would be a natural addition to the publisher's pre-existing "sultry and strong female characters". Editor-in-Chief Ralph Tedesco also announced that "the key to this series success is to strike a nice balance in creating a brand new, intriguing storyline for fans of the television show while also not alienating Zenescope and comic book readers who haven't really followed it before". It was further announced that while the TV series had a difficult time due to casting and budget limitations, the comic creators would not have those problems, thus fans may finally see the return of popular characters like Prue and Cole.

Although the comic books feature the likeness of the majority of the actors who appeared in the television series including Alyssa Milano (Phoebe Halliwell), Holly Marie Combs (Piper Halliwell), Rose McGowan (Paige Matthews), Brian Krause (Leo Wyatt) and Julian McMahon (Cole Turner), Shannen Doherty's (Prue Halliwell) likeness does not feature in the comic books. Ralph Tedesco officially released a statement that Shannen Doherty had not given her permission for the comic book creators to use her likeness in the series, saying that "Unfortunately Ms. Doherty has declined to be involved in the comic version of Charmed. This includes the use of her likeness. We had hoped that she would allow us to use her image and that we would be able to bring her into the Charmed comic book exactly as she was in the show but at this point that has become impossible. While Ms. Doherty’s likeness will not be used for the character we are still very excited about the direction we are going with Prue and we hope that fans of Charmed will feel the same way."

Shannen Doherty revealed at Oz Comic-Con in 2013 that her decision to not give permission for her likeness to be used was based on Zenoscope's unwillingness to pay her to use her likeness.

CBS and Zenescope officially reached an agreement for a tenth season. It was announced in April 2014 that Paul Ruditis stepped down as lead writer and would edit the series, while Pat Shand would write the new story and Elisa Féliz would be pencilling. The first issue of Charmed: Season 10 debuted at New York Comic Con during the weekend of October 9, 2014.

=== Writing and format ===
Author Paul Ruditis was hired as lead writer of Season 9 with established Zenescope author Raven Gregory co-writing the first three issues alongside him. Ruditis was already familiar with the "Charmed universe" having previously published three tie-in novels, two official episode guides (co-authored with Diana G. Gallagher), and the Charmed Book of Love Spells. Ruditis and Gregory also co-authored a special Issue 0, which acted as a prequel to the series by summarising the events of the television series in a style reminiscent to the Book of Shadows depicted in the show. For Season 10, Pat Shand assumed the role of writer and Ruditis acted as editor.

Artist Dave Hoover was hired to create the interior artwork while David Seidman was hired to design the covers for the comics, although various guest artists have contributed variant covers for each issue, including Greg Horn, Al Rio, Tony Shasteen and Mark Sparacio. Hoover departed the series after completing Issue 3. Since then various artists have been hired to create the interior artwork such as Marcio Abreu (4, 5 and 7), Carlos Granda (8), Tess Fowler (6 and 11), Dean Kotz (9, 12, 14 and 15), and Reno Maniquis (10 and 13).

Although the process of writing and receiving studio clearance was much the same as for Charmed novels, Ruditis explains, "The big difference now...is that with original episodes no longer airing, we have a lot more freedom than we did on the novels." With the Charmed novels, nothing outrageous could occur to distort established continuity. Stories had to take place "between" episodes, usually in the first half of a given season. Ruditis notes that while "[t]he studio still has to approve the direction we take," no longer does "everything... have to reset by the end. That alone means that nothing is entirely safe." Ruditis and Gregory claim they wanted the series to "grow and evolve" in the new medium, "expand[ing] upon what worked and what didn't work." The creators believe it stands out from the Buffy, Angel and Pushing Daisies television-to-comic adaptations because Charmed has a unique focus on the dynamics of family drama.

According to Shand, the comics and novels based on the franchise were part of the Charmed canon and follow the established continuity of the series.

== Publication ==
=== Issues ===
The first issue premiered during San Diego Comic-Con in July 2010. Initially only 12 issues were contracted by Zenescope, with around five issues comprising one story arc which would be reprinted in graphic novel form. A one-shot issue has also been announced for Issue #6, and another is followed when Issue #13 comes to start the new story arc.

=== Season 9 (2010–12) ===
Issue in Series	Issue in Season	Title	Written by	Penciled by	Original Release Date
Volume 1
0	0	"The Sourcebook"	Paul Ruditis & Raven Gregory	Dave Hoover	June 16, 2010
1	1	"Charmed Lives"	Paul Ruditis & Raven Gregory	Dave Hoover	July 21, 2010
2	2	"No Rest for the Wicca"	Paul Ruditis & Raven Gregory	Dave Hoover	September 1, 2010
3	3	"Innocents Lost"	Paul Ruditis & Raven Gregory	Dave Hoover	October 6, 2010
4	4	"Mortal Enemies"	Paul Ruditis	Marcio Abreau	December 15, 2010
5	5	"Unnatural Resources"	Paul Ruditis	Marcio Abreau	January 19, 2011
Volume 2
6	6	"Morality Bites... Back"	Paul Ruditis	Tess Fowler	February 16, 2011
7	7	"The Heir Up There"	Paul Ruditis	Marcio Abreu	March 2, 2011
8	8	"Oh, Henry"	Paul Ruditis	Carlos Granda	March 16, 2011
9	9	"All or Nothing"	Paul Ruditis	Dean Kotz	May 25, 2011
10	10	"Three Little Wiccans"	Paul Ruditis	Reno Maniquis	June 8, 2011
11	11	"Last Witch Effort"	Paul Ruditis	Tess Fowler	June 22, 2011
12	12	"The Charmed Offensive"	Paul Ruditis	Dean Kotz	July 27, 2011
Volume 3
13	13	"Piper's Place"	Paul Ruditis	Reno Maniquis	September 7, 2011
14	14	"Cupids Harrow"	Paul Ruditis	Dean Kotz	September 28, 2011
15	15	"Where There's Smoke There's a Firestarter"	Paul Ruditis	Dean Kotz	October 26, 2011
16	16	"The Heavens Can Wait"	Paul Ruditis	Dean Kotz	November 30, 2011
17	17	"Family Shatters"	Paul Ruditis	Dean Kotz	January 4, 2012
18	18	"Four's Company"	Paul Ruditis	Dean Kotz	January 25, 2012
19	19	"Crossed, Triple Crossed"	Paul Ruditis	Tess Fowler	March 7, 2012
Volume 4
20	20	"The Old Witcheroo"	Paul Ruditis	Dean Kotz	March 28, 2012
21	21	"Reversal of Misfortune"	Paul Ruditis	Dean Kotz	May 2, 2012
22	22	"Prue Ya Gonna Call?"	Paul Ruditis	Rubine	July 11, 2012
23	23	"The Darklight Zone"	Paul Ruditis	Rubine	September 5, 2012
24	24	"The Power of 300"	Paul Ruditis	Rubine	October 3, 2012

=== Season 10 (2014–16) ===
Issue in Series	Issue in Season	Title	Written by	Penciled by	Original Release Date
Season 10: Volume 1
25	1	"No Country for Old Ones"	Pat Shand	Elisa Féliz	October 8, 2014
26	2	"Magically Malicious"	Pat Shand	Elisa Féliz	November 5, 2014
27	3	"The Perks of Being a Whitelighter"	Pat Shand	Elisa Féliz	December 10, 2014
28	4	"Charmed Assault"	Pat Shand	Elisa Féliz	January 21, 2015
29	5	"Whatever Happened to the Demon with a Soul?"	Pat Shand	Elisa Féliz	February 18, 2015
30	6	"Will o' the Witch"	Pat Shand	Daniela Di Matteo	March 18, 2015
Season 10: Volume 2
31	7	"Hard Knox Life"	Pat Shand	Daniela Di Matteo	April 22, 2015
32	8	"Love is a Burning Thing"	Pat Shand	Elisa Féliz	May 20, 2015
33	9	"Haste Makes Wasteland"	Pat Shand	Elisa Féliz	June 10, 2015
34	10	"The Curious Case of Benjamin Turner"	Pat Shand	Elisa Féliz	July 22, 2015
35	11	"Fear Always Comes Back"	Pat Shand	Elisa Féliz	September 2, 2015
36	12	"Virtue"	Pat Shand	Elisa Féliz	October 7, 2015
Season 10: Volume 3
37	13	"Court of Love"	Pat Shand	Giorgia Sposito	November 4, 2015
38	14	"The Four Sisters, Chapter 1"	Pat Shand	Elisa Féliz	December 2, 2015
39	15	"The Four Sisters, Chapter 2"	Pat Shand	Elisa Féliz	January 13, 2016
40	16	"Happy Ending"	Pat Shand	Elisa Féliz	February 10, 2016
41	17	"Effigy"	Pat Shand	Elisa Féliz	March 2, 2016
42	18	"Tribunal and Tribulations"	Pat Shand	Elisa Féliz	April 13, 2016
43	19	"Something Old, Something Prue"	Pat Shand	Elisa Féliz	July 6, 2016
44	20	"The Reason"	Pat Shand	Elisa Féliz	September 14, 2016

== Collected issue ==
=== Season 9 ===
The issues were collected together into trade paperbacks:

#	Title	Publisher	Year	ISBN	Reprints
1	Charmed: Season 9: Volume 1	Zenescope Comics	February 8, 2011	ISBN 0982582676	Collects The reprinted material is, in whole or in part, from: Charmed: Season 9 #0–5
1	Credits and full notes Writer(s) Penciller(s): Paul Ruditis; Raven Gregory; Dave Hoover; Marcio Abreau; Novo Malgapo				Collects The reprinted material is, in whole or in part, from: Charmed: Season 9 #0–5
2	Charmed: Season 9: Volume 2	Zenescope Comics	September 20, 2011	ISBN 0982582692	Collects The reprinted material is, in whole or in part, from: Charmed: Season 9 #6-12
2	Credits and full notes Writer(s) Penciller(s) Paul Ruditis: Tess Fowler; Marcio Abreu; Carlos Granda				Collects The reprinted material is, in whole or in part, from: Charmed: Season 9 #6-12
3	Charmed: Season 9: Volume 3	Zenescope Comics	April 11, 2012	ISBN 193706896X	Collects The reprinted material is, in whole or in part, from: Charmed: Season 9 #13-19
3	Credits and full notes Writer(s) Penciller(s) Paul Ruditis: Reno Maniquis; Dean Kotz; Tess Fowler				Collects The reprinted material is, in whole or in part, from: Charmed: Season 9 #13-19
4	Charmed: Season 9: Volume 4	Zenescope Comics	November 7, 2012	ISBN 1937068609	Collects The reprinted material is, in whole or in part, from: Charmed: Season 9 #20-24
4	Credits and full notes Writer(s) Penciller(s) Paul Ruditis: Dean Kotz; Rubine				Collects The reprinted material is, in whole or in part, from: Charmed: Season 9 #20-24

Note: The full title of all volumes listed here start with "Charmed Season 9: ".

=== Season 10 ===
The issues were collected together into trade paperbacks:

#	Title	Publisher	Year	ISBN	Reprints
1	Charmed: Season 10: Volume 1	Zenescope Comics	April 29, 2015	ISBN 1942275021	Collects The reprinted material is, in whole or in part, from: Charmed: Season 10 #1–6
1	Credits and full notes Writer(s) Penciller(s) Pat Shand: Elisa Feliz; Daniela Di Matteo				Collects The reprinted material is, in whole or in part, from: Charmed: Season 10 #1–6
2	Charmed: Season 10: Volume 2	Zenescope Comics	September 6, 2016	ISBN 978-1942275183	Collects The reprinted material is, in whole or in part, from: Charmed: Season 10 #7–12
2	Credits and full notes Writer(s) Penciller(s) Pat Shand: Elisa Feliz; Daniela Di Matteo				Collects The reprinted material is, in whole or in part, from: Charmed: Season 10 #7–12
3	Charmed: Season 10: Volume 3	Zenescope Comics	October 11, 2016	ISBN 9781942275282	Collects The reprinted material is, in whole or in part, from: Charmed: Season 10 #13–20
3	Credits and full notes Writer(s) Penciller(s) Pat Shand: Elisa Feliz; Giorgia Esposito				Collects The reprinted material is, in whole or in part, from: Charmed: Season 10 #13–20

Note: The full title of all volumes listed here start with "Charmed Season 10: ".

== Reception ==
Critical reaction was initially mixed for the first issue, with many reviewers complaining about the lack of story. Reviews for Issue #2 in relation to the story have been much more positive with Fandomania awarding the issue 3/5. However some noted that the issue does a good job at exposing the series to newcomers. The artwork however has received the most criticism both for the characters likeness' and the colouring, which is deemed distracting by a Newsarama reviewer. Christina Flores of ComicImpact.com goes on to say that the interior art is inconsistent, with the character drawings not being as good as those of locations and backgrounds. However, she goes on to say that Ruditis and Gregory open with a strong story and says that Charmed fans will enjoy the issue. Fan response however has been promising with the first issue selling out of its initial 17,000 copies in the first three weeks, which prompted Zenescope to release a second printing in time for the release of Issue #2.

=== Cast reaction ===
- Alyssa Milano has touched upon the comic series in interviews, talking about how she gave Zenescope her permission to use her likeness for her character.
- Rose McGowan and Holly Marie Combs have discussed the comics on Twitter, most notably joking about the cover for Issue #2 which pictures the Charmed Ones naked covered only in leaves.
