= Charmed: Season 9 =

Comic book series

Publication information
- Publisher: Zenescope Entertainment
- Schedule: Monthly
- Publication date: June 16, 2010—October 3, 2012
- No. of issues: 24
- Main character(s): Piper Halliwell; Phoebe Halliwell; Paige Matthews

Creative team
- Written by: Paul Ruditis; Raven Gregory (0–3)
- Penciller(s): Dean Kotz (9, 12, 14–18, 20 & 21); Dave Hoover (0–3); Marcio Abreu (4, 5 & 7); Tess Fowler (6, 11 & 19); Reno Maniquis (10 & 13); Carlos Granda (8); Rubine (22–24)
- Letterer: Jim Campbell
- Colorist(s): Milen Parvanov (1–4 & 7); John Hunt (5, 6 & 8); Michael Spicer (14–18); Joshua Wentzell (18)
- Editor: Ralph Tedesco

Charmed: Season 9 is a comic book series that was published monthly between June 2010 and October 2012 by Zenescope Entertainment, which owns the publishing rights to the Charmed comic book series. Written by Paul Ruditis and Raven Gregory, the series is an officially licensed continuation of the popular television series of the same name, which ended its eight-year run in 2006. Charmed: Season 9 is set eighteen months after the events of the television show's final episode. The first issue was released on July 21, 2010, and made its premiere at San Diego Comic-Con. The series concluded with the season finale issue, "The Power of 300", and was succeeded by the novels The War on Witches (2015) and Let Gorgons Be Gorgons (2016), both written by Ruditis, as well as Season 10 (2014–2016), written by Pat Shand.

The series narrative follows the Charmed Ones – sisters Piper and Phoebe Halliwell and Paige Matthews – the most powerful good witches in history who use their combined "Power of Three" to protect innocent lives from demonic beings. After being reunited with their late elder sister, Prue, who was killed less than a decade earlier, the four sisters vanquish the demon Rennek in order to safeguard the existence and secrecy of magic.

The series was generally well received. One volume made The New York Times Best Seller list in early 2011. Initially, only 12 issues were contracted by Zenescope but, due to the success of the first few issues, the contract was doubled to 24 issues. One story arc comprises between five and seven issues which are reprinted in graphic novel form. The first issue sold out of its initial 17,000 copies in the first three weeks, which prompted Zenescope to release a second printing in time for the release of Issue #2.

== Plot ==
=== Arc One (Issues 1–5) ===
Set eighteen months after "Forever Charmed", the sisters have each entered into motherhood free of demons. Piper has had a third child, a girl named Melinda and is planning on opening her own restaurant. Phoebe has had her first daughter, Prue, with Coop and is preparing to return to work. Paige has had twin girls with Henry, is working as a whitelighter, and is seen helping Leo at Magic School with his students. Two new warlocks named Neena and Hogan begin implementing a plan to revive one of the sisters' greatest foes. The first arc begins with Piper and Phoebe attending the funeral of Brittany, the first "innocent" they ever saved. Meanwhile, Paige visits her latest charge, a high school bully named Brent, a witch later targeted and murdered by Neena and Hogan. While searching the Book of Shadows for clues to Brittany's death, Phoebe receives a powerful premonition showing that every single innocent saved by the sisters over the past nine and a half years is in grave danger.

While Piper and Paige attempt to gather as much information about their past innocents' current whereabouts, Phoebe finds her empathy power has returned as she conducts the wedding of Romeo & Juliet. Piper and Paige arrive at the home of Tyler Michaels, a teenage firestarter whom they saved from The Source many years ago. They find him under attack from demons who want to revive The Source, following Neena and Hogan's plan. Paige then receives a new power: a force field called an orb shield. The Charmed Ones later gather at the manor where they realize that they must go back to fighting evil, but they are unaware that Neena and Hogan's plan has been successful. When The Source makes himself known to the sisters and attacks them outside the manor with a huge fireball, Piper attempts to attack him and discovers that she has a new power. This causes the street to melt and bind to The Source, causing him to get stuck. The sisters escape to Magic School. Gathering magic from all their supernatural allies and using it in tandem with the "Power of Three", The Charmed Ones effectively vanquish The Source once again.

=== Arc Two (Issues 6–12) ===
The second arc picks up with the one-shot, "Morality Bites...Back". In the issue, after Cal Greene begins dating her assistant Mika, Phoebe deals with the potential threat of the baseball player based on a premonition she received nearly 10 years ago. When her empathy powers advance, Phoebe learns that she uses her empath powers to murder Cal in the future by reflecting his emotions back onto him, causing his brain to overload. After Cal attacks her editor Elise, Phoebe fears she will fulfill her premonition. Instead, she confides her secret identity as a witch to Elise and together they use magic to scare Cal into a confession. Later in the arc, Piper learns that her daughter Melinda is half-whitelighter, despite Leo being mortal during her conception. New Elder Kyle Brody reveals that the previous Elders activated Leo's latent whitelighter genes in her, hoping to making a more powerful "Power of Three" with Melinda and her half-whitelighter brothers, Wyatt and Chris. Now that The Source has been vanquished by The Charmed Ones, Neena, who has killed Hogan, has taken control of the Underworld and sets her sights on taking control of the Upper Regions and home of The Elders.

In the eighth issue, "Oh, Henry", Paige rescues a baby from the womb of a dying and homeless teenage mother. She and Henry adopt the boy and name him Henry Jr. Later in the second arc, in an altercation with Neena, Piper is sent into an alternate dimension. While trying to rescue her, Phoebe and Paige discover that Neena is no ordinary warlock; she is the First Witch and has been waiting many millennia to enact revenge upon The Elders and Angels of Destiny for interfering with her life and lover. Meanwhile, Piper realizes she is not alone in her alternate world; she talks with an Angel of Destiny who informs her of Neena's origins. Piper also interacts with Cole Turner, who provides her with an escape from the alternate dimension. After Piper is reunited with her sisters, The Charmed Ones and the spirits of their ancestral line battle Neena and her demon army in the Upper Regions in an all-out war. With the help of the Angels of Destiny and Leo, who gains mysterious powers after picking up an artifact protected by The Elders, The Charmed Ones soothe Neena's anger and banish her to the alternate world where Piper was previously imprisoned. While there, she is reunited with her lost love for six months out of every year. Realizing that meddling with Neena's destiny nearly resulted in her destroying the world, the Angels of Destiny also undo the meddling The Elders performed on The Charmed Ones' children, promising that should a new "Power of Three" emerge, it will be natural and not through outside influence.

=== Arc Three (Issues 13–19) ===
The third arc begins with "Piper's Place" and features the grand opening of Piper's restaurant named "Halliwell's". This arc features the long-awaited return of Prue. After Penny and Patty task Cole with finding Prue's missing spirit in exchange for helping him find peace in the afterlife, he locates her in the form of a blonde-haired witch named Patience who resides in Salem, Massachusetts. When confronted by Cole about her true identity, Prue (as Patience) explains that she was never allowed to move on into the afterlife; the prophecy of the Charmed Ones kept her tied to her sisters. As long as Prue still had a connection to the Warren line, she would stop her sisters from realizing their full power. She had to go someplace to be alone and chose a quiet corner of the Astral Plane. She found a witch who was in a coma with no chance of recovery and took over her body. In order to not interfere with the new "Power of Three", Prue chose to stay away from her sisters and used her powers to protect innocents. She asks Cole to keep her secret.

Paige later finds herself with a new charge, a telekinetic witch named Sarah who happens to be Patience's co-worker at a Salem tour house. Paige shows up looking for Sarah; however, Cole won't let her in the house. Despite his pleas, she orbs into the house, where she meets Patience (Prue) and the two touch, causing their powers to blast them apart. After recovering, Patience tells Paige that she is Prue. At first, Paige doesn't believe her, but they go to the manor where Prue, Piper, and Phoebe are finally reunited. Prue's presence causes the sisters' powers to go haywire because the Charmed prophecy never spoke of a "Power of Four". To diffuse the chaos, Paige volunteers to strip her powers so that Prue can rejoin her sisters in the "Power of Three". Cole steps in and informs Prue that the real reason she remained tied to the "Power of Three" and unable to move on in the afterlife was because she refused to truly let go of her destiny with her sisters. Realizing that her time as a Charmed One has passed, Prue strips herself of her Warren powers. After removing her active powers, she keeps the basic powers that allow her to cast spells and brew potions. Prue later returns to Salem with Cole, who will help her train new witches to atone for his evil past.

=== Arc Four (Issues 20–24) ===
The fourth arc begins with "The Old Witcheroo". Due to the machinations of Rennek, all magical beings have been disempowered and all mortals have been granted the ability to use magic. Because her powers were stripped at the time, not only did Prue gain her powers back, but she also gained all of her sisters' powers. Over the next six months, Prue became extremely busy as she was considered the most powerful witch on Earth. Prue figures out how to give her sisters their powers back: if she continues using her powers, they will drain from her and gradually return to her sisters. Phoebe gives birth to a girl, Parker, in the Manor. She wishes Prue could have been there, and apologizes to Parker for bringing her into the world without her magic to protect her from it. Elise tells Piper that the magical situation is the biggest news story ever and that some think it could be the end of the world. She assures Phoebe that the world will right itself soon enough. They wonder what Rennek is up to, believing that he's somewhere mobilizing his forces and plotting against them. Meanwhile, he is lying pool-side on a hammock with two magical creatures pampering him. Prue returns to the manor after many months away, very tired from all her battles. Neither Darryl nor her sisters can recognize her (they see Patience, not Prue's soul). Prue tells her sisters that Rennek stole the Grimoire before implementing his plan.

Next, Phoebe has a premonition in which she sees Prue dying. Prue (who has had the same premonition) drives out the enemy but dies. She enters limbo again and meets Cole. He tells her that the entrances to the Upper Regions and the Underworld have been closed to everyone, magical or not. Cole says that the dead magical creatures in that dimension could tear a hole back to Earth, and wants Prue to do it because he has information that could help her sisters. Prue returns to the land of the living. The sisters learn there is another Nexus, The Nexus of the All. It is located in the desert and can resolve the current magical issues. During the battle with Rennek at the Nexus of the All, Prue grabs the Empyreal Sword out of the Grimoire, absorbing it into herself. She casts a spell that gives her ownership over both items and vanquishes Rennek. Prue (covered in various symbols and runes) casts another spell to reconnect the realms at that place and to erase all memories of the last six months. The Nexus of the All is now a complete replica of the Manor, and everyone goes inside. "Patience"'s body has now become Prue's for good. Because she absorbed the Sword and the Grimoire, she is now the conduit that holds the realms together. She is the caretaker of the connection and can never leave the Nexus. Cole is her messenger.

== Publication ==
=== Issues ===
Issue in Series	Issue in Season	Title	Written by	Penciled by	Original Release Date
Volume 1
0	0	"The Sourcebook"	Paul Ruditis & Raven Gregory	Dave Hoover	June 16, 2010
This sourcebook serves as a prequel to the comics series.
1	1	"Charmed Lives"	Paul Ruditis & Raven Gregory	Dave Hoover	July 21, 2010
The Charmed ones return in this new series that picks up where the series left off. Claiming their victory in the battle against evil, Piper, Phoebe, and Paige were free to settle into the future with their husbands and children.
2	2	"No Rest for the Wicca"	Paul Ruditis & Raven Gregory	Dave Hoover	September 1, 2010
As the charmed ones go about settling into their new lives, forces from the underworld prepare to unleash a power that will destroy the sisters. Paige accepts a new position and learns the hard way that teaching isn't the easiest job. Phoebe and Piper attend the funeral of Brittany, the first innocent they ever saved, only to find that her death may herald the beginning of something terrifying that will endanger the lives of all innocents and the Charmed Ones themselves.
3	3	"Innocents Lost"	Paul Ruditis & Raven Gregory	Dave Hoover	October 6, 2010
Someone or something is hunting down and murdering the innocents that have been saved by the Charmed Ones. As Piper, Phoebe, and Paige race to save the remaining innocents, the forces of the underworld continue to gather the last remaining ingredients that will complete the ritual to bring back the greatest foe the Charmed ones have ever faced.
4	4	"Mortal Enemies"	Paul Ruditis	Marcio Abreau	December 15, 2010
To keep them safe from harm, the Charmed ones bring the remaining innocents back to the manor. Little do they know the Source has returned and cast a spell turning every innocent in the entire city against them. Even as they fight to survive, the Charmed Ones learn that the Source has planned his arrival at the perfect time to destroy the Power of Three once and for all.
5	5	"Unnatural Resources"	Paul Ruditis	Marcio Abreau	January 19, 2011
The Charmed Ones face off against an ancient evil with an army of minions that present Piper, Phoebe, and Paige with their greatest challenge ever. These forces of evil are bent on destruction, tearing apart the Halliwell family, and maybe keeping Piper from ever opening her restaurant.
Volume 2
6	6	"Morality Bites... Back"	Paul Ruditis	Tess Fowler	February 16, 2011
Almost a decade ago Phoebe Halliwell saw a future in which she was publicly burned at the stake for killing a mortal that murdered her friend. Now as the time approaches for her premonition to play itself out, what can she do, if anything, to stop it? Phoebe questions whether the events are destined to play out the way she saw them or if enough has changed to save both her friend's life as well as her own.
7	7	"The Heir Up There"	Paul Ruditis	Marcio Abreu	March 2, 2011
Piper is distraught when she finds that her baby daughter has the same orbing power as her part-Whitelighter aunt Paige and worries that it could put her children at risk again as it did when Wyatt was born. Leo decides to make a visit to the Elders for an explanation and is given an intriguing offer but one that would seriously affect his future with Piper. Meanwhile, warlock Neena has teamed up with a Darklighter, and the two set forth on a Whitelighter killing spree in order to absorb their abilities. Now that she has taken control of the Underworld, Neena sets her sights on the Upper Regions.
8	8	"Oh, Henry"	Paul Ruditis	Carlos Granda	March 16, 2011
An Innocent homeless teen in San Francisco falls victim to a stray arrow during a Darklighter's attack on a Whitelighter. The pregnant teen is dead, but Paige manages to save the girl's baby by orbing the child out of the body immediately. Neena finally reveals herself to the Charmed Ones while taking on an Elder directly on the streets of San Francisco. During the battle, Neena sends Piper into the void where she sent the Angel of Destiny in Issue 1. Phoebe and Paige want to stay to fight the stranger and rescue their sister, but Leo forces them to flee.
9	9	"All or Nothing"	Paul Ruditis	Dean Kotz	May 25, 2011
Leo must reveal an ancient secret to The Charmed Ones about the very source of their craft and the true origins of the magic they possess if they have any chance of defeating their latest threat.
10	10	"Three Little Wiccans"	Paul Ruditis	Reno Maniquis	June 8, 2011
With the Power of Three torn asunder, Phoebe and Paige work to bring their family back together. But a tragically ill-advised plan pulls The Charmed Ones further apart and could leave one of the sisters lost forever.
11	11	"Last Witch Effort"	Paul Ruditis	Tess Fowler	June 22, 2011
A decision is made that could affect The Power of Three and irrevocably change The Charmed Ones. Humanity hangs in the balance in the coming showdown between good and evil.
12	12	"The Charmed Offensive"	Paul Ruditis	Dean Kotz	July 27, 2011
The Charmed Ones and Leo face down impossible challenges in a battle to reclaim the Heavens, conquer the Underworld, and save the Earth. It is a fight that has been brewing long before the prophecy of The Charmed Ones was foreseen.
Volume 3
13	13	"Piper's Place"	Paul Ruditis	Reno Maniquis	September 7, 2011
Owning a restaurant of her very own has been Piper's dream for years. Now it is finally real. Opening night is a huge success and she's the talk of the town, but the additional workload—along with the magical turmoil of late has taken a toll on her family life. A child's misguided spell has disastrous results as Piper learns whether or not she can truly have it all while she copes with a situation that would leave other moms quaking in their shoes.
14	14	"Cupids Harrow"	Paul Ruditis	Dean Kotz	September 28, 2011
Coop is on one of the toughest assignments a Cupid can accept, and this time it comes with unexpected consequences. When Phoebe sees her husband plagued with questions about the family he never met, she tries to help by researching his past, unaware that a mysterious force works against her. As she tries to orchestrate a reunion centuries in the making, she could wind up tearing a family apart.
15	15	"Where There's Smoke There's a Firestarter"	Paul Ruditis	Dean Kotz	October 26, 2011
Trouble comes knocking on Paige's front door when a mysterious fire nearly burns down her house. The nature of the attack suggests a firestarter, but the real answer might not be that simple. Are The Charmed Ones about to face another threat from the past, or is the culprit a more recent addition to their lives? A secret that Piper's been keeping might hold the answer to more than just Paige's question, or it could lead to a whole new set of problems instead.
16	16	"The Heavens Can Wait"	Paul Ruditis	Dean Kotz	November 30, 2011
The Charmed Ones embark on a quest to help Leo find the answer to the question that has been plaguing him for months. They will need to call on all their powers and the bond they share to protect them from the dangers that await. Meanwhile, Cole takes an important step in his journey for a different kind of answer.
17	17	"Family Shatters"	Paul Ruditis	Dean Kotz	January 4, 2012
A seemingly innocent encounter will have disastrous effects on The Charmed Ones as the final piece of Rennek's plan falls into place. While Leo goes after his old nemesis, Piper, Phoebe, and Paige must deal with a visitor from the past that could destroy their future.
18	18	"Four's Company"	Paul Ruditis	Dean Kotz	January 25, 2012
Demons have the run of San Francisco, Magic School is in turmoil, and Leo is missing (again). When personal problems intertwine with magical ones, every member of the Halliwell family is in danger. The Charmed Ones must come together to bring the world back into order while their own magic works to tear it apart.
19	19	"Crossed, Triple Crossed"	Paul Ruditis	Tess Fowler	March 7, 2012
When a criminal threatens Paige's happy family, she looks to her past to deal with the mortal menace. Conjuring up a detective from one of her favorite noir novels, Paige creates a gumshoe to help set up a sting and take down the hood. But when the fictional private Dick decides he likes life outside the pages, the setup takes a dark and dangerous turn.
Volume 4
20	20	"The Old Witcheroo"	Paul Ruditis	Dean Kotz	March 28, 2012
Magical beings run amok in the streets, sending the powerless into hiding. Cut off from the Elders, the Angels of Destiny, and much of the magical community, there is no one to turn to for help. All hope seems lost in a world in which the Charmed Ones are no longer Charmed.
21	21	"Reversal of Misfortune"	Paul Ruditis	Dean Kotz	May 2, 2012
With Magic School's doors no longer open, Knox Academy is one of the few places on earth that can provide a safe haven in need. Piper, Phoebe, and Paige must team with the staff to protect themselves and their friends from the government's modern day witch hunt that has deemed anyone like them to be the enemy.
22	22	"Prue Ya Gonna Call?"	Paul Ruditis	Rubine	July 11, 2012
Magic gangs fight for control against government forces seriously out of their depth. Even with Piper, Phoebe, and Paige on the case, there is little they can do without their own magic. Overwhelmed and outnumbered, the side of good must hang all their hope on the single most powerful witch in the world.
23	23	"The Darklight Zone"	Paul Ruditis	Rubine	September 5, 2012
A voice from beyond the grave provides answers from the past as four sisters come together to solve a magical crisis that has affected the entire world. With an army of friends beside them, The Charmed Ones prepare for their biggest battle ever.
24	24	"The Power of 300"	Paul Ruditis	Rubine	October 3, 2012
Four sisters, bound by love and magic, have had their lives turned upside down many times in the years since they first inherited their powers. Now they must put aside their differences and work together to take back their world. The Charmed Ones will need to unleash the full strength of the magic that has been growing through their family line for centuries in an epic battle that will bring season nine to its earth-shattering conclusion.

=== Collected editions ===
The issues are collected into trade paperback by Zenescope Entertainment after each story arc is complete.

Issue in Series	Issue in Season	Title	Written by	Penciled by	Original Release Date
1	1	"Volume 1"	Paul Ruditis & Raven Gregory	Dave Hoover, Marcio Abreu & Novo Malgapo	February 2, 2011
It has been a year and a half since Piper, Phoebe, and Paige were victorious in their ultimate battle against evil. They've put the past behind them and settled into their relatively quiet lives with their families. But the death of the first innocent that the Charmed Ones ever saved has reawakened an ancient evil more powerful than the sisters have ever faced. Now with a brand new threat emerging, the Charmed Ones must prepare for the fight of their lives. Volume #1 collects issues #0 – #5.
2	2	"Volume 2"	Paul Ruditis	Tess Fowler, Marcio Abreu & Carlos Granda	September 7, 2011
It begins innocently enough when a child reveals powers she should not possess, leading to an offer that few could decline. The Charmed Ones have long since come to terms with their magical calling complicating their lives, but that doesn't make things any easier as they face down challenges that could tear their families apart. Their latest threat comes from a mysterious power that is finally revealed in the body of an enemy Piper, Phoebe, and Paige never dreamed they'd encounter. The sisters must unite again in a battle between the Heavens and the Underworld that could destroy not only The Power of Three, but all of humanity in the process.
3	3	"Volume 3"	Paul Ruditis	Reno Maniquis, Dean Kotz & Tess Fowler	April 11, 2012
The years have passed quickly for The Charmed Ones since they learned of their magical heritage. In only one decade they have experienced so much love and loss, joy and sorrow, failure and success. But time marches on and new challenges will be met as Phoebe is haunted by her past, Piper must deal with the present, and Paige is forced to cope with the future. But none of those events will prepare them to face the truth behind a family secret that could change everything for the Warren line.
4	4	"Volume 4"	Paul Ruditis	Dean Kotz & Rubine	January 2013
It has been six months since the Charmed Ones reunited with their lost sister, and the world looks nothing like it did before. The magical community is powerless while everyday humans can suddenly control magic. Earth is cut off from the Heavens and the Underworld, and the Power of Three has completely abandoned Piper, Phoebe, and Paige. What began as a weird magical glitch has quickly developed into a full-on crisis. The formerly powerless humans of the world are letting their new gifts go out of control. The government is tracking down former magic users to find out what they know about this odd turn of events. Even worse, the Charmed Ones can't do a thing about it since the one person that could help them has disappeared from their lives once again.

== Reception ==
=== Commercial performance ===
The series' first trade volume had 1,116 units accounted in Diamond Comic Distributors' distributed comic shops during its release month, February 2011, placing it 57th on the trade paperbacks chart. The second trade had 774 units accounted in September that same year, and placed 130th on the chart. The third trade volume was published in April 2012 and sold 691 units, placing 145th on the chart. In November that same year, the fourth volume sold 619 units and placed 175th on the chart.

Charmed: Season 9: Physical sales per issue (in thousands)

Volume 1
#	Sales	Average	Diamond ranking
0	6,329	8,138	239
1	12,061	8,138	151
2	8,464	8,138	212
3	7,524	8,138	212
4	7,253	8,138	232
5	7,196	8,138	171

Volume 2
#	Sales	Average	Diamond ranking
6	7,014	5,751	210
7	6,160	5,751	261
8	6,046	5,751	265
9	5,883	5,751	219
10	4,858	5,751	290
11	5,352	5,751	283
12	4,946	5,751	261

Volume 3
#	Sales	Average	Diamond ranking
13	4,722	3,453	271
14	4,626	3,453	274
15	3,916	3,453	335
16	3,835	3,453	315
17	3,692	3,453	267
18	3,561	3,453	312
19	3,512	3,453	291

Volume 4
#	Sales	Average	Diamond ranking
20	—N/a	3,201	—N/a
21	3,227	3,201	340
22	3,244	3,201	313
23	3,173	3,201	322
24	3,161	3,201	361
