= Charmed season 8 =

Season of television series

Charmed
- Season 8
- DVD cover
- Starring: Alyssa Milano; Rose McGowan; Holly Marie Combs; Kaley Cuoco; Brian Krause
- No. of episodes: 22

Release
- Original network: The WB
- Original release: September 25, 2005 – May 21, 2006

Season chronology
- ← Previous; Season 7

The eighth and final season of Charmed, an American supernatural drama television series created by Constance M. Burge, premiered in the United States on The WB from September 25, 2005, through May 21, 2006.

Paramount Home Entertainment released the complete eighth and final season in a six-disc box set on September 11, 2007. It was later released on high-definition blu-ray on November 16, 2021. Both feature an instrumental opening for all the episodes, as opposed to the show's original theme song, as the music rights were no longer available.

== Cast and characters ==
=== Main ===
- Alyssa Milano as Phoebe Halliwell
- Rose McGowan as Paige Matthews
- Holly Marie Combs as Piper Halliwell
- Kaley Cuoco as Billie Jenkins
- Brian Krause as Leo Wyatt (Note: Only credited for the episodes he appears in.)

=== Recurring ===
- Jennifer Rhodes as Penny Halliwell
- James Read as Victor Bennett
- Rebecca Balding as Elise Rothman
- Brandon Quinn as Agent Murphy
- Nigel Gibbs as Jonnah
- Jason Lewis as Dex Lawson
- Ivan Sergei as Henry Mitchell
- Denise Dowse as Angel of Destiny
- Marnette Patterson as Christy Jenkins
- Victor Webster as Coop
- Leland Crooke as Candor
- Steven J. Oliver as Asmodeus
- Søren Oliver as Baliel
- Anthony Cistaro as Dumain

=== Guest ===
- Janice Dickinson as Glamoured Paige Matthews
- Glenn Morshower as Agent Keyes
- Jennifer Taylor as Eve
- Noa Tishby as Black Heart
- Michelle Stafford as Mandi
- Peter Woodward as The Source of All Evil
- Alana de la Garza as Sylvia
- Arjay Smith as Speed
- Simon Templeman as Angel of Death
- Faran Tahir as Savard
- Drew Fuller as Chris Halliwell
- Finola Hughes as Patty Halliwell
- Scott Jaeck as Sam Wilder
- Wes Ramsey as Wyatt Halliwell

=== Special Musical Guest ===
- Liz Phair

== Episodes ==
No. overall	No. in season	Title	Directed by	Written by	Original release date	Prod. code	U.S. viewers (millions)
157	1	"Still Charmed & Kicking"	James L. Conway	Brad Kern	September 25, 2005	62015-08-157	4.27
The final season premieres after being presumed dead by the outside world, the sisters cast a spell so that their appearance is altered to the outside world, but not to those closest to them. Though Phoebe and Piper begin to adapt to a magic-free life, Paige cannot escape her Whitelighter half, which continues to tell her that there is a new charge in the world that needs her. There are also those who do not believe the Halliwells to be dead, and seek to prove it. Paige has trouble locating her charge, and when she finally catches up with the young witch, she finds that her new charge has embarked on a solo vigilante career to do good and combat demons, but appears unaware of the real dangers of this.
158	2	"Malice in Wonderland"	Mel Damski	Brad Kern	October 2, 2005	62015-08-158	3.83
Haas, a demon who suspects the witches have survived, uses the Alice's Adventures in Wonderland story to prey on humans, hoping this will lure the witches out of cover. Paige's new charge in her whitelighter career, is a blonde college student with enviable martial arts skills, Billie Jenkins who is fighting demons in leather, high heels and dark sunglasses. She denies sending "help' messages to Paige, but Leo says they could be subliminal calls. Meantime, Paige enlists as a police recruit, hoping to satisfy her need to fight evil while Phoebe and Piper end up in positions with the paper and at the P3 club doing their old jobs. Paige gets the hots for one of her instructors but leaves training to rescue Billie alongside her sisters. NB. This episode has a narration in the style of Carrie Bradshaw from Sex and the City.
159	3	"Run, Piper, Run"	Derek Johansen	Cameron Litvack	October 9, 2005	62015-08-159	4.12
Looking for a new career path, Piper goes on an interview with a corporate recruiter, but is soon arrested when a background check reveals that the physical appearance she adopted was that of a model wanted for murder. In fact, the model was innocent, framed by her obsessive ex-boyfriend who is a crooked assistant District Attorney. The Charmed Ones, with Bille's help, must come up with a plan to save her once they switch the real woman into Piper's jail cell. They take inspiration from the Demon of Fear, Barbas, to have the District Attorney implicate himself on tape in the murder. In their personal lives, Phoebe continues to date Dex, the artist she believes she will marry.
160	4	"Desperate Housewitches"	Jon Paré	Jeannine Renshaw	October 16, 2005	62015-08-160	4.21
Piper makes a costume for Wyatt's school play but is patronised by another mother, Mandi. Mandi is in fact being possessed by a demoness who plans on getting Wyatt used to her and then taking him to a familiar place (magic school) where he will help her resurrect the Source of All Evil. Paige sees Dex kissing another woman, who turns out to be his ex-girlfriend. Paige speaks to the woman who says she and Dex had 'break-up sex'. So, Paige masquerades as the woman to confront Dex but finds out the woman often lies. Dex apologizes to Phoebe later, saying he probably shouldn't have stayed in touch with his ex. Meanwhile, Leo is educating Billie and the two visit magic school where they find demons. Billie returns to our world for power-of-three reinforcements while Leo stays with Wyatt. With Wyatt's help, the demoness has conjured the Source to life. Billie returns with the three sisters. Piper vanquishes the Source by dealing with the demoness; the two were magically linked.
161	5	"Rewitched"	John T. Kretchmer	Rob Wright	October 23, 2005	62015-08-161	4.26
Agent Murphy of Homeland Security, who has suspected all along that the Halliwell sisters are not dead, spots Billie using her powers to save an innocent from a cloud of demonic imps. Meanwhile, Phoebe's planned trip with Dex turns strange when Billie casts a spell intending to make her happy: Phoebe and Dex become married! Both Paige and Phoebe have concluded that living a lie as 'cousins' without magic powers is untenable, and innocents are suffering as well. Agent Murphy confronts Piper and says the world needs their continued help. Billie sets a trap for the Demons and vanquishes the imp-master while the power of three vanquishes the Demon behind him. At the end of the episode, the three agree that the masquerade should be canceled. Approaching Agent Murphy, the three cut a deal to have him cover for them by explaining away their faked deaths as being due to national security concerns which allows them to resume life as themselves.
162	6	"Kill Billie Vol. 1"	Michael Grossman	Elizabeth Hunter	October 30, 2005	62015-08-162	4.32
While the Charmed ones are dealing with paparazzi and Halloween, armed and ready to vanquish, Billie inexplicably freezes and is flooded with childhood flashbacks when she sees her latest demon target, the Dogan. Billie casts a spell to erase her fears and goes after the demon, and realizes that her sister Christy was kidnapped by demons when she was only a child.
163	7	"The Lost Picture Show"	Jonathan West	Doug E. Jones & Andy Reaser	November 6, 2005	62015-08-163	3.87
Wanting to return to her old career as a social worker, Paige's plans get put on hold, when her Whitelighter father, Sam, returns asking for her help with his charge. Initially, she doesn't want to help as she doesn't feel he was around enough to be considered her dad. However, by the end of the episode she accepts him. Meanwhile, Piper and Leo go to see a magical marriage counselor who thinks the best therapy is for them to walk a mile in each others' shoes – literally. When they eventually become considerate of each others' difficulties (Leo has lost his powers and Piper has a multitude of obligations) they are switched back into the correct bodies.
164	8	"Battle of the Hexes"	LeVar Burton	Jeannine Renshaw	November 13, 2005	62015-08-164	4.38
Agent Murphy gives the sisters their first Homeland Security case – searching through cold case files, where Phoebe and Billie discover a belt that gives Billie superpowers. Meanwhile, Piper and Leo are on the hunt for a band to play at P3; and Paige, while trying to save a new charge from his criminal peers, meets her new charge's parole officer Henry.
165	9	"Hulkus Pocus"	Joel F. Feigenbaum	Liz Sagal	November 20, 2005	62015-08-165	4.22
Phoebe has decided to take a hiatus from men. Piper seems to think Agent Murphy and the government are hiding something from the sisters. She and Paige discover that an experiment with a captured demon created a deadly virus that is infecting the magical community, including Billie. The virus initially doubles a magical being's powers but then kills them. An upper level demon wants to access the power doubling but avoid the death. Eventually the witches destroy the virus by allowing it to infect them so they are more powerful and finding 'patient zero' who was not affected in the military experiments. His blood has the anti-virus to facilitate a cure.
166	10	"Vaya Con Leos"	Janice Cooke Leonard	Cameron Litvack	November 27, 2005	62015-08-166	4.34
The Angel of Death returns to visit the Charmed Ones, but they're shocked to learn that he's there for Leo. To stop him from taking Leo, Piper casts a spell that backfires, making every man a Leo lookalike, forcing Piper to take drastic measures and ask the Elders and the Avatars for help. Meanwhile, Billie (with Phoebe) continues her search for the truth behind Christy's disappearance and meets Burke, a demonic bounty hunter who freezes his victims into trophies. The Charmed Ones summons the Angel of Destiny and she tells them that Leo must die to boost their anger and magical powers to be used in a coming battle. The witches come up with a compromise: Burke's freezer is used to freeze Leo and the Angel of Destiny agrees to return him if the Halliwells triumph in the coming battle.
167	11	"Mr. & Mrs. Witch"	James L. Conway	Rob Wright	January 8, 2006	62015-08-167	3.31
When her parents come for a visit, Billie accidentally transforms them into assassins. She also contacts a demon who is posing as a human - he was kidnapped as a child and she thinks he can give her information about her sister. Meanwhile, Piper attempts to continue her life without Leo; Paige tries to make a connection with Henry; Phoebe tries to solve a difficult reader's problem. Billie's parents are hired by the demon-human to kill his cousin who runs the family company. The witches stop them but the demon-human shoots his cousin and is able to blame Billie's parents. The sisters use a summoning spell to draw the parents into the attic where a tearful Billie returns them to themselves after she learns that they DID keep searching for her sister. Piper transforms herself into the demon-human and confesses to murder before the press. An arch-demon then shoots the real demon-human as he is no longer of use to her.
168	12	"Payback's a Witch"	Mel Damski	Brad Kern	January 15, 2006	62015-08-168	3.47
With the intention of helping his parolee get a loan, Henry, along with Paige, go to a bank -- but after being rejected, the parolee takes everyone at the bank hostage. Meanwhile, Phoebe and Piper have their hands full when, during Wyatt's third birthday party, Wyatt uses his projection power to turn three of his toys into real people. Unfortunately the situation at the bank degenerates when Henry is accidentally shot and a possessor demon, wanting to expose the Charmed Ones, possesses the parolee and tries to force Paige to orb Henry to a hospital and expose herself. Unexpectedly she develops the Whitelighter healing power and heals Henry's wound before switching places with Billie using her glamouring power. "Billie" is taken hostage by the demon who takes her to Magic School, but Paige then orbs them to the manor attic where Piper and Phoebe dispossesses the parolee and Billie vanquishes the demon.
169	13	"Repo Manor"	Derek Johansen	Doug E. Jones	January 22, 2006	62015-08-169	3.67
Phoebe, in an attempt to move on with her own life, signs a lease for a new apartment, much to the worry of Piper, while Paige considers telling Henry she's a witch. Demons attempt to steal the Power of Three by taking the form and place of each sister, one by one, as each sister is shrunk and placed into a dollhouse replica of the manor.
170	14	"12 Angry Zen"	Jon Paré	Cameron Litvack	February 12, 2006	62015-08-170	3.28
During Chinese New Year, a demon attempts to steal a mystical wooden staff that is protected by the Zodiacs, and the staff's guardian enlists the aid of Piper to stop him. However, the staff concentrates each of the Charmed Ones' desires: Phoebe throws a housewarming party that gets out of control; Paige tries to get through to Henry about her magical abilities by taking him on a round-the-world orb; and Piper drops everything to run to her children's outing. Meanwhile, the guardian teaches Billie how to use her power of projection to find Christy and enlists her help to save the staff from the demons.
171	15	"The Last Temptation of Christy"	John Kretchmer	Story by : Rick Muirragui; Teleplay by : Liz Sagal	February 19, 2006	62015-08-171	3.89
Paige learns the difficulties of dating a mortal when Henry becomes too involved in the magical world and has to deal with another magical suitor hoping to convince her to marry him so they can become the ultimate magical couple. Meanwhile, Billie finally finds her missing sister Christy; Piper faces a romantic decision when she runs into an old flame, and Piper must explain that Leo is coming back despite it looking like he abandoned his family.
172	16	"Engaged and Confused"	Stuart Gillard	Jeannine Renshaw	February 26, 2006	62015-08-172	4.07
Piper organizes an engagement party for Paige and Henry, but the wedding is put in jeopardy when the couple begins to get cold feet. Phoebe notices a strange man following her, and soon discovers that he is a Cupid. Meanwhile, a demon kidnaps Christy in order to lure the Charmed Ones into attacking the Triad, thus preventing them from taking over the Underworld. In a battle with the Triad at Magic School, Paige and Piper vanquish one by orbing him in front of a fireball and Piper blows up the second. The third flees, but unlike how they expected, Leo is not returned, showing that defeating the Triad was not the battle that they have to win to get Leo back.
173	17	"Generation Hex"	Michael Grossman	Rob Wright	April 16, 2006	62015-08-173	2.98
Two former students of Leo's from Magic School turn up at the manor to inform the Charmed Ones that Noxon demons that Leo had imprisoned in the Magic School dungeons have escaped and are seeking revenge. Christy tries to get Billie away from the sisters, and Billie wants Christy to reunite with her parents. Paige goes on her honeymoon, and Coop continues to follow Phoebe. One of the Noxon demons is eventually vanquished by Piper and the students sending him to the Astral Plane in a perpetual vanquish, but beforehand, the two demons kill Billie and Christy's parents under orders from Candor, the last remaining member of the Triad. In retaliation, Christy vanquishes Candor, but he claims that by doing so she passed her final test to become evil.
174	18	"The Torn Identity"	LeVar Burton	Andy Reaser	April 23, 2006	62015-08-174	3.39
Coop comes to the conclusion that he has fallen for Phoebe. Piper is on the hunt for the remaining Noxon demon in order to interrogate him about who he's working for, but Christy just wants to kill him as soon as possible. Paige finds it hard balancing life as a Charmed One with that of a married woman. When both the Halliwells and the Jenkinses find the Noxon demon, Billie and Christy combine their powers to vanquish an unvanquishable demon making Piper realize that Billie and Christy may be the ultimate power whom they must face in the coming battle.
175	19	"The Jung and the Restless"	Derek Johansen	Cameron Litvack	April 30, 2006	62015-08-175	3.17
Christy continues to try to corrupt Billie with the help of the demon Dumain, who work for the Triad; the two conspire to throw the sisters into a dream world so Billie can determine their true desires. Meanwhile, Piper consults an Elder who says that they may have to fight Billie and Christy to the death, and Paige gains a new charge in trouble with a Darklighter. Paige's charge is killed while Paige is in the dream world but becomes a whitelighter and later saves an injured Paige. After seeing the Charmed Ones' goals for normal lives, Billie opts to join Christy's plan to eliminate them because of their selfishness. After coming out of the dream world, Phoebe and Paige finally accept the truth about the Jenkinses.
176	20	"Gone with the Witches"	Jonathan West	Jeannine Renshaw	May 7, 2006	62015-08-176	3.39
Christy has now managed to convince Billie that the Charmed Ones are too self obsessed to help the 'greater good' so when Paige, Phoebe and Piper attempt to involve the rest of the magical community, Christy and Billie cast spells on the sisters that turn all the leprechauns and other creatures against the Halliwells. With their support, Christy and Billie then directly attack the Charmed Ones who attempt to escape to Magic School but find that it has been blocked from them and so end up in the underworld...
177	21	"Kill Billie Vol. 2"	Jon Paré	Brad Kern	May 14, 2006	62015-08-177	3.72
In the first half of the two-episode series finale, Billie and Christy have managed to turn everything around: while the two of them are now at the Manor and demons are at Magic School, the Charmed Ones are forced to hide in the Underworld. A battle of competing potions ends up injuring both sides, who each decide that they need to become more powerful. The Jenkinses and the Halliwells each absorb part of the Hollow, which the Jenkinses then use to steal Wyatt's powers and the Halliwells use to vanquish the Triad for good. The two sets of sisters attack each other in the Manor, not knowing the deadly consequences of their actions — Phoebe, Paige, and Christy are all killed and the Manor is destroyed in a massive explosion. The Angel of Destiny returns Leo, although the battle did not end as expected. Billie flees from Piper.
178	22	"Forever Charmed"	James L. Conway	Brad Kern	May 21, 2006	62015-08-178	4.49
Reeling from the death of her sisters, Piper and Leo, using Coop's ring, travel back in time to change the events that led to the deaths of Phoebe and Paige. They encounter Patty (then pregnant with Phoebe) and Grams (just after Patty's death). While time-traveling, Piper and Leo also meet their future selves, indicating that they succeed. Meanwhile, Billie also tries to go back in time, but her past self ignores her. Patty and Grams help Piper recreate the Power of Three and vanquish the Hollow during the fatal battle, but the Jenkinses then disappear. Billie finally realizes that her sister has become evil after Christy admits being in league with the Triad. Grown-up Chris and Wyatt return from the future to find Wyatt's stolen powers, just as Billie comes to the Manor seeking the help of the Halliwells to save Christy. Dumain and Christy steal Coop's ring to time-travel and warn the Triad, but Billie (tracking Christy) transports the Halliwells to the same place, and the Triad and Dumain are again permanently vanquished. Billie tries to convince Christy, but when Christy launches a fireball at the sisters, Billie deflects it, accidentally killing Christy. At the end, everyone is returned to the proper time, and the sisters write down a narrative covering their future: Phoebe continues writing her column, marries Coop (permitted by the Elders), and has three daughters, with Billie looking after the first two when Phoebe goes into her third labour; Paige and Henry have twin girls and then Henry Jr., as Henry stays a parole officer and Paige becomes a full-time Whitelighter; Leo remains the headmaster of Magic School until retirement; Piper opens a restaurant; and Piper and Leo have a daughter in addition to Wyatt and Chris. In the final scene at the Manor, Piper's granddaughter, named Prudence, closes the front door with telekinesis (just like Prue) while the triquetra appears on the screen.

== Reception ==
=== Ratings ===
The season premiere, which aired on September 25, 2005, garnered 4.27 million viewers; an increase from the 3.44 million viewers who watched the seventh-season finale. The season and series finale, "Forever Charmed", was watched by 4.49 million viewers, making it the highest rated episode of the season. The eighth season averaged 3.5 million viewers for all 22 episodes. Out of all regular primetime programming that aired during the 2005–06 U.S. television season, Charmed ranked 132nd out of 156, according to the Nielsen ratings system.

=== Accolades ===
The eighth season of Charmed was nominated for various awards.

== DVD release ==
Charmed: The Eighth and Final Season
Set details	Special features	
22 episodes; Six-disc set; English (Dolby Digital 2.0 Surround)	The Making of Charmed; The Story of Charmed: A 2-part Documentary; The Final 22 Episodes; To the Manor Born: Behind-the-Scenes look at the Halliwell Manor; Forever Charmed: A Profile of Charmed Fans; Cast And Crew Audio Commentaries On Select Episodes	
DVD release dates
Region 1	Region 2	Region 4
September 11, 2007	April 30, 2007	April 11, 2011
