= List of Charmed novels and short stories =

Charmed novels and short stories
- The Charmed logo was first used for the television series and later for the novel and comic series.
- Author: Reference individual listings
- Country: United States
- Language: English
- Genre: Fantasy, young adult fiction
- Publisher: Simon & Schuster (1999–2008); HarperCollins (2015–2016)
- Published: November 1, 1999 – January 1, 2008; May 26, 2015 – February 2, 2016
- Media type: Print (paperback); E-book
- No. of books: 43

The Charmed literary franchise is a series of novels and short stories based on the eponymous television show, which aired from 1998 to 2006. The franchise consists of forty-three novels and eleven short stories released in two anthologies, with ten guide books. Scholarly essay collections on the show were also published. The first work in the series, The Power of Three, published in November 1999, is a novelization of the series pilot "Something Wicca This Way Comes". Writers of the novels had to obtain approval from Paramount Pictures or CBS Consumer Products to ensure that they followed the canon established for the television series. Writers Paul Ruditis and Pat Shand have discussed these regulations, primarily through their official Tumblr accounts.

Between 1999 and 2008, forty-one novels were published by Simon & Schuster and were set roughly during the same period as the events of the television series. A majority of the novels are original stories revolving around the Charmed Ones and their allies. Ten novels are set between the show's first and third season, and feature the Charmed Ones – Prue, Piper, and Phoebe Halliwell – as the most powerful witches of all time. Thirty-one novels are set after Prue's death in "All Hell Breaks Loose", starting with the novelization of the season four premiere "Charmed Again", and include Piper and Phoebe's half-sister Paige Matthews.

Two works, Seasons of the Witch (2003) and The Warren Witches (2005), are anthologies of short stories. Various authors have written works in the series, including Diana G. Gallagher and Paul Ruditis, who also co-authored two guidebooks, The Book of Three in 2004 and 2006. In 2015, HarperCollins acquired the rights to publish a second series of Charmed novels from CBS Consumer Products which owns the rights to the franchise. Two novels were published in this series — The War on Witches (May 2015) and Let Gorgons Be Gorgons (February 2016) — and its continuity fits between the events of Season 9 (2010–12) and Season 10 (2014–16) of the comic book series.

== Continuity between television show and novels ==
Writers of all officially licensed Charmed literature must obtain studio approval of the content of the works – originally from Paramount Pictures until CBS Consumer Products acquired the rights to the franchise – in order to adhere to the conventions of the Charmed canon established by the television series. According to Paul Ruditis, authors of Charmed novels and comics must maintain "the rules for playing in that universe" and "the studio still has to approve the direction we take" as writers. Following these regulations, authors are given creative license but strictly "couldn't go and rewrite history, killing off established characters or suddenly creating romantic pairings that we'd never see on the show".

Pat Shand, the writer of Charmed: Season 10, considered the novels and comics officially part of the Charmed canon and continuity. The comics reference the novels; for example, Shand consulted with Ruditis about the character Tyler Michaels in Charmed: Season 10. While Tyler had first appeared in the season four episode "Lost and Bound", Ruditis had also portrayed him in the novel The Brewing Storm (2004), and Shand wanted to avoid inconsistencies or "retreading".

== First novel series ==
No.	Title	Author	Publisher	Date	Length	Plot	Notes
1	The Power of Three	Eliza Willard	Pocket Pulse	November 1, 1999	181 pp	Prue, Piper, and Phoebe Halliwell discover that they are the Charmed Ones, the most powerful witches of all time, after Phoebe reads an incantation from a book in the attic. Prue gains the power of telekinesis, Piper can stop time, and Phoebe can see the future. While adjusting to their new magical destiny, the sisters must defend themselves against a warlock who wants to kill them and steal their powers.	Novelization of the pilot episode: "Something Wicca This Way Comes"
2	Kiss of Darkness	Brandon Alexander	Simon & Schuster	February 1, 2000	182 pp	Set on New Year's Eve, Prue is cursed after receiving a kiss from a stranger. She feels an uncontrollable urge to kiss other men. With the curse making her feel weaker with each kiss, if she continues she will eventually die. Piper and Phoebe work together to reverse the curse and save Prue's life.	Original novel that takes place in Season 1
3	The Crimson Spell	F. Goldsbourgh	Pocket Pulse	March 28, 2000	181 pp	A group of warlocks are hunting the Halliwell sisters by infiltrating their lives under the guise of friendship. They slowly drain the Charmed Ones' powers while the sisters are unaware of their true intentions. Phoebe grows attracted to a reporter posing as a member of the warlocks' coven.	Original novel that takes place in Season 2
4	Whispers From The Past	Rosalind Noonan	Pocket Pulse	June 1, 2000	179 pp	A demon kidnaps Phoebe and pulls her several centuries into the past. While there, Phoebe meets the two daughters of her ancestor Melinda Warren. In the present, Prue and Piper are devastated at their sister's disappearance; they believe she may have died. They begin to turn evil due to a demon's interference in the past.	Original novel that takes place in Season 2
5	Voodoo Moon	Wendy Corsi Staub	Pocket Pulse	August 1, 2000	181 pp	The Halliwell sisters go to New Orleans for a vacation. However, during their first night in the city, Phoebe begins to have dreams of violent rituals taking place under a full moon. When Phoebe's new friend disappears on the night of the full moon, the Charmed Ones find themselves drawn into a demonic plot involving voodoo.	Original novel that takes place in Season 2
6	Haunted by Desire	Cameron Dokey	Pocket Pulse	October 1, 2000	181 pp	Phoebe enrolls in an additional college course in order to broaden her intellectual potential and becomes attracted to Brett, one of her new classmates. However, she is soon confronted by his jealous ex-girlfriend Wendy. When Phoebe works with Brett on a group assignment, she receives threatening notes and believes something supernatural is behind the messages.	Original novel that takes place in Season 2
7	The Gypsy Enchantment	Carla Jablonski	Pocket Pulse	April 2, 2001	181 pp	For her next photo assignment, Prue is tasked to help with the development of an article on the Carnival Cavalcade. While Prue hates the circus, Piper and Phoebe are excited to see the attractions and Ivan, the attractive Gypsy animal trainer. However, Phoebe has a premonition that Ivan will strangle Piper.	Original novel that takes place in Season 2
8	The Legacy of Merlin	Eloise Flood	Pocket Pulse	April 3, 2001	179 pp	Prue travels to Hay-on-Wye to acquire medieval books for a collector, and Piper and Phoebe join her on the trip. Piper researches how to create love charms with flowers, and Phoebe has a premonition of a mysterious man, Niall, holding an infant while standing on a heath. The sisters then discover that Niall is a part of a druid ceremony.	Original novel that takes place in Season 2
9	Soul of the Bride	Elizabeth Lenhard	Pocket Books	May 22, 2001	180 pp	Prue competes in a competition to take an original picture for 415 Magazine. She uses an antique camera, provided by Phoebe's latest boyfriend, to take the pictures. The camera causes all of her models to collapse and the sisters must travels into the Greek underworld to rescue them.	Original novel that takes place in Season 2
10	Beware What You Wish	Diana G. Gallagher	Pocket Pulse	July 31, 2001	179 pp	Disturbed by the increasing number of tragic incidents covered in the news, Phoebe wishes she could use her power to prevent any negative event from occurring in the future. When Phoebe begins to have more premonitions than she can physically handle, Prue and Piper work together to help her.	Original novel that takes place in Season 3
11	Charmed Again	Elizabeth Lenhard	Simon Pulse	October 2, 2001	181 pp	Piper and Phoebe mourn the death of their sister Prue, and are left vulnerable to demonic attack after the disruption of the Power of Three. They discover that they have a secret half-sister Paige Matthews and attempt to connect with her before The Source of All Evil turns her evil.	Novelization of the Season 4 premiere: "Charmed Again"
12	Spirit of the Wolf	Diana G. Gallagher	Simon Pulse	May 1, 2002	207 pp	A resort in the Sierra Nevada is cursed by recurrences of supernatural omens. The owners are thought to be defiling the sacred tribal lands of a nearly extinct Native American group. Phoebe and Paige work with a shaman to confront the demon behind these occurrences.	Original novel that takes place in Season 4
13	Garden of Evil	Emma Harrison	Simon Pulse	July 1, 2002	198 pp	Phoebe discovers that Paige's latest boyfriend is really the demon Vandalus. Vandalus traps Paige in his garden and seduces her in order to break his curse and access his full powers. Piper and Phoebe work with Cole Turner to save her.	Original novel that takes place in Season 4
14	Date With Death	Elizabeth Lenhard	Simon Pulse	September 1, 2002	186 pp	While Piper and Leo Wyatt discuss the possibility of children, and Phoebe and Cole celebrate their engagement, Paige feels pressure to find the perfect partner. When she signs up for an online dating service, Piper and Phoebe discover she is being placed in a catatonic trance while on the dates.	Original novel that takes place in Season 4
15	Dark Vengeance	Diana G. Gallagher	Simon Pulse	November 1, 2002	202 pp	The Halliwell sisters are feeling overwhelmed by recent changes in their lives. Phoebe begins to lose her short-term memory, Piper loses control of her emotions, and Paige always feels exhausted. With their powers diminishing, they are vulnerable to demonic threats.	Original novel that takes place in Season 4
16	Shadow of the Sphinx	Carla Jablonski	Simon Pulse	January 1, 2003	185 pp	While experimenting with her magic, Paige turns herself into a cat, and cannot change herself back into her human form. Unaware of the transformation, her sisters take her to an animal shelter. Paige becomes the familiar of a cult and is sent back to ancient Egypt.	Original novel that takes place in Season 4
17	Something Wiccan This Way Comes	Emma Harrison	Simon Pulse	March 1, 2003	215 pp	Witches from a coven mysteriously disappear after attending a Wiccan convention in Las Vegas. With the help of Darryl Morris, the Halliwell sisters investigate the disappearances and discover they may be connected to a group of Egyptian demigods.	Original novel that takes place in Season 4
18	Mist and Stone	Diana G. Gallagher	Simon Pulse	May 1, 2003	201 pp	Paige has difficulty consoling a young child who has gone through several caretakers and is angry at authority. Phoebe has a premonition involving the boy, but it is completely shrouded by fog. Leo reveals that the mist in the vision is because Todd's fate is not being set in stone, and the sisters attempt to reverse his destiny.	Original novel that takes place in Season 4
19	Mirror Image	Jeff Mariotte	Simon Spotlight Entertainment	July 1, 2003	227 pp	Phoebe has a premonition that Paige is an imposter who wants to disband the Power of Three. Piper and Phoebe disagree over the best way to handle the situation, and Paige notices and feels more isolated from them. When she decides to keep her new friendship with a young male witch, the sisters begin to distrust one another.	Original novel that takes place in Season 4
20	Between Worlds	Bobbi J. G. Weiss and Jackyln Wilson	Simon Pulse	September 1, 2003	201 pp	The sisters discover that buildings around the city are melting due to a plot to destroy the divide between the worlds of the living and the dead. They track the occurrences to an untrained witch named Claire Katherine "C. K." Piers, who is in possession of a book that was used to curse an evil witch 500 years ago.	Original novel that takes place in Season 4
21	Truth and Consequences	Cameron Dokey	Simon Pulse	November 1, 2003	196 pp	Cole becomes angry with Phoebe after discovering that she has gone on a date with another man. As the couple fight over their relationship, they find themselves caught in a demon's scheme to destroy the Power of Three.	Original novel that takes place in Season 4
22	Luck Be A Lady	Scott Ciencin	Simon Spotlight	January 6, 2004	214 pp	While trying to protect the sisters from a demon's plot, Cole accidentally sends everyone back in time to World War II-era Hollywood. Paige poses as an upcoming actress to uncover clues on demonic businesses, Piper tries to find the past version of Leo, and Phoebe attempts to convince Cole to send them back to their proper time.	Original novel that takes place in Season 5
23	Inherit the Witch	Laura J. Burns	Simon Spotlight	March 2, 2004	212 pp	The sisters are approached by a young witch named Juliana O'Farrell to help her daughter Lily find her powers. In Juliana's clan, they bind their children's powers until they are mature enough to control them. However, when Lily cannot access her magic, the sisters are tasked to find out who has stolen her powers.	Original novel that takes place in Season 4
24	A Tale of Two Pipers	Emma Harrison	Simon Spotlight	May 4, 2004	203 pp	After Piper becomes increasingly stressed about balancing her personal and professional lives, she splits into two bodies. When Leo is kidnapped by a group of darklighters, Phoebe and Piper are dismayed to discover that one of the Pipers is apathetic about his capture and both Pipers are losing control over their powers.	Original novel that takes place in Season 4
25	The Brewing Storm	Paul Ruditis	Simon Spotlight	July 6, 2004	234 pp	When the city is struck by a series of freak weather patterns, the sisters discover they are omens indicating mass destruction. In order to stop the natural disasters, they must help a young witch who has trouble controlling his pyrokinesis.	Original novel that takes place in Season 4
26	Survival of the Fittest	Jeff Mariotte	Simon Spotlight Entertainment	August 31, 2004	227 pp	A large number of people are reported missing in the city, and mysteriously reappear with no memories regarding their absences. A woman sends a letter to Phoebe's advice column, writing that her sister was taken, and that she has become obsessed with an exercise video since her return. The sisters investigate the work-out program and its creator to see if there is something supernatural involved.	Original novel that takes place in Season 6
27	Pied Piper	Debbie Viguie	Simon Spotlight Entertainment	November 2, 2004	177 pp	After Piper and Leo start to discuss having more children, they notice that infants have been appearing on their front porch and coming into their house. While Piper attempts to find answers about the babies, Phoebe discovers that there have been several disappearances in the city, and they all were candidates to conduct a youth symphony.	Original novel that takes place in Season 4
28	Mystic Knoll	Diana G. Gallagher	Simon Spotlight Entertainment	February 7, 2005	217 pp	The sisters plan to take a vacation in Salem and the beaches of Massachusetts, but find themselves in an unknown location following a series of traveling incidents. While staying at a bed and breakfast run by a witch practitioner and her daughter, they discover there have been supernatural events occurring in the small town.	Original novel that takes place in Season 5
29	Changeling Places	Micol Ostow	Simon Spotlight Entertainment	March 22, 2005	152 pp	When Piper starts leaving her son Wyatt at a day care center, she notices that he is beginning to act strangely, and other babies in the facility are exhibiting the same behavior. On further investigation, the sisters discover that someone has been switching babies all across the city, and they attempt to discover the culprit.	Original novel that takes place in Season 5
30	The Queen's Curse	Emma Harrison	Simon Spotlight Entertainment	July 26, 2005	207 pp	Paige believes that she has met the perfect man, and is excited when he proposes to her. She discovers that he is a prince of a magical kingdom and is already engaged to another woman. He tells her that he must marry another magical being by his 25th birthday, or else his kingdom will be destroyed.	Original novel that takes place in Season 6
31	Picture Perfect	Cameron Dokey	Simon Spotlight Entertainment	September 27, 2005	199 pp	Phoebe reprints love letters from the tumultuous and tragic relationship between architect William Lancaster and divorcée Isabella Marshall as part of her column. When a mural created by Lancaster is restored and unveiled to the public, Isabella's daughter warns that an evil has been released. After multiple murders occur in the city, the sisters attempt to find out the truth behind the mural.	Original novel that takes place in Season 6
32	Demon Doppelgangers	Greg Elliot	Simon Spotlight	November 22, 2005	240 pp	Paige gets a new job as a museum guide for an ancient Greek exhibit. A mysterious stone egg is added to the display, and a demon hatches from it and takes on the appearance of her co-worker Chase. The sisters attempt to stop the demon while also protecting Chase.	Original novel that takes place in Season 6
33	Hurricane Hex	Diana G. Gallagher	Simon Spotlight Entertainment	February 7, 2006	213 pp	When Phoebe is invited to a seminar in Orlando, the sisters go on a vacation to Florida, only to discover that a hurricane has changed course to head right towards them. Paige becomes concerned for her old college friend Sharon Grant after she starts practicing folk magic with her neighbor.	Original novel that takes place in Season 5
34	As Puck Would Have It	Paul Ruditis	Simon Spotlight Entertainment	April 11, 2006	222 pp	Each of the sisters have odd encounters with service workers on the same day: Piper with a housekeeper, Phoebe with a computer technician, and Paige with a hiking guide. They discover that the trickster Puck is spreading chaos; he tasks them to find an innocent who requires their protection in a crowded circus before time runs out.	Original novel that takes place in Season 6
35	Sweet Talkin' Demon	Laura J. Burns	Simon Spotlight	May 9, 2006	187 pp	Phoebe believes she has found true love after meeting Daniel, but Paige has doubts after seeing a demon in his living room. Meanwhile, Leo is caught up with his work as a whitelighter and begins to forget about his family, and Paige starts to lose her powers.	Original novel that takes place in Season 6
36	Light of the World	Scott Ciencin	Simon Spotlight Entertainment	August 1, 2006	241 pp	Phoebe and Piper's childhood friend Lyssa announces that she is getting married in an old lighthouse on the coast, and wants them to be her bridesmaids. On arriving at the ceremony, the sisters hear rumors of an evil spirit of a lighthouse keeper, and notice Lyssa's fiancé has become increasingly obsessed with her family heirloom, a diamond known as the Light of the World.	Original novel that takes place in Season 6
37	House of Shards	Micol Ostow	Simon Spotlight Entertainment	October 24, 2006	178 pp	The sisters believe that the manor is being transformed into an evil air and attempt to find the cause. While hiding in the attic protected by the magic from the Book of Shadows, they are forced back in time to witness events that have occurred in the manor in the past.	Original novel that takes place in Season 6
38	Phoebe Who?	Emma Harrison	Simon Spotlight Entertainment	December 26, 2006	193 pp	Exhausted from balancing her personal life and responsibilities as an advice columnist and witch, Phoebe accepts help from a new friend Aura to find a more relaxed life. However, Aura convinces Phoebe to steal protection charms from new witches, and attempts to make her believe that Piper and Paige have turned evil.	Original novel that takes place in Season 6
39	High Spirits	Scott Ciencin	Simon Spotlight	April 24, 2007	215 pp	The sisters attend a party organized by Paige's ex-boyfriend Kevin Peterson, only to be greeted by the ghost Robert Maxwell, who has died under mysterious circumstances in 1926. As people start disappearing from the party, and the doors in the venue become sealed, they must unearth the truth behind Robert's death.	Original novel that takes place in Season 6
40	Leo Rising	Paul Ruditis	Simon Spotlight Entertainment	August 28, 2007	205 pp	The sisters are captured by the demonic scientist Dr. Gnivik, who wants to steal the Power of Three. Leo, who was recently turned mortal, calls upon future versions of his sons Chris and Wyatt to help rescue them.	Original novel that takes place in Season 7
41	Trickery Treat	Diana G. Gallagher	Simon Spotlight Entertainment	January 1, 2008	191 pp	During a Halloween party, Paige casts a spell as a way to honor the dead. However, she inadvertently opens a portal for leprechauns and spirits to crash the celebrations, and the sisters must stop one ghost before he kills a ghost-hunter.	Original novel that takes place after Season 8

== Second novel series ==
Title	Author	Publisher	Date	Length	Plot	Ref.
The War on Witches	Paul Ruditis	HarperCollins Publishers	May 26, 2015	200 pp	Set after the events of both the final episode of the television series, and the final print issue of Charmed: Season 9, the narrative details the reunion of the younger Charmed Ones, Piper, Phoebe, and Paige, with their oldest sister, Prue, who was killed at the end of the third season. Creating an alliance with the newly resurrected former-demon Cole Turner, Phoebe's former husband, the four Charmed Ones use the Power of Three to protect witches from a witch hunt in modern-day San Francisco.	
Let Gorgons Be Gorgons	Paul Ruditis	HarperCollins Publishers	February 2, 2016	203 pp	After undoing a spell that turned a politician to stone, Piper, Phoebe, and Paige ask Prue for help in understanding the power behind the hex. They discover that a horde of Gorgons has been attacking innocents, and that Medusa has been released from her tomb to turn men into stone.	
Social Medium	Pat Shand	HarperCollins Publishers	Unpublished	200 pp	Phoebe has nightmares of being stalked, and Piper and Paige attempt to decipher the meaning behind her dreams and question if they are really premonitions. Working with Prue and Cole, the sisters collaborate with a witch who can communicate with the dead in order to prevent Phoebe from dying.	
Symphony for the Devil	Pat Shand	HarperCollins Publishers	Unpublished			

== Children's book ==
Title	Author	Artist	Publisher	Date	Length	Plot	Ref.
Charmed: The Illustrated Storybook	Paul Ruditis	Ria Maria Lee	Insight Editions	October 4, 2022	40 pp	Set in the 1980s, the story serves as a prequel to the television series and focuses on younger versions of Prue, Piper, and Phoebe Halliwell.	

== Short stories ==
Title	Publication	Author	Publisher	Date	Plot	Ref.
"Samhain"	Seasons of the Witch Vol. 1	Laura J. Burns and Emma Harrison	Simon Pulse	October 1, 2003	During Halloween, Phoebe tries to communicate with her ancestors, but is interrupted when she is tasked to reunite a pair of star-crossed lovers.	
"Yule"	Seasons of the Witch Vol. 1	Laura J. Burns and Emma Harrison	Simon Pulse	October 1, 2003	During the winter solstice, Paige goes to a party at a night-club, and must stop a demon's plot to cause permanent midnight.	
"Imbolc"	Seasons of the Witch Vol. 1	Laura J. Burns and Emma Harrison	Simon Pulse	October 1, 2003	During Imbolc, Piper tries to plan for her future with Leo and a growing family, but she becomes concerned when Paige's powers start to get out of control. Piper begins to wonder if a hybrid witch/whitelighter baby can have a healthy life.	
"Old Friend"	The Warren Witches	Laura J. Burns	Simon Spotlight Entertainment	May 31, 2005	Paige reunites with an old friend named Emmeline Graydon, but their time is cut short when Emmeline reads a spell from the Book of Shadows and disappears. While trying to find Paige's friend, the sisters are pulled back in time to the 1920s, when the manor was a speakeasy.	
"The Crucible"	The Warren Witches	Micol Ostow	Simon Spotlight Entertainment	May 31, 2005	Phoebe hires a student named Marissa Hargrave to be her intern, but she has a premonition of her new assistant being attacked by a mob. While trying to decipher the meaning of her vision, Phoebe discovers that Marissa is hated by her peers and is a target of a demon powered by hate.	
"Patty's Awakening"	The Warren Witches	Greg Elliot	Simon Spotlight Entertainment	May 31, 2005	Set in 1966, a sixteen-year-old Patty Halliwell questions if she would like to live a life with or without magic. After Patty falls in love with a classmate and decides to give up her powers, Penny Halliwell discovers that the boy's stepmother is a demoness plotting to steal her magic.	
"Something Old, Something New"	The Warren Witches	Paul Ruditis	Simon Spotlight Entertainment	May 31, 2005	The sisters are sent back in time to Colonial America. They meet Prudence Warren, the daughter of their ancestor Melinda. They discover that she wants to give up her powers, and question how they can convince her to keep her magic and protect the future.	
"Preconceived"	The Warren Witches	Erica Pass	Simon Spotlight Entertainment	May 31, 2005	After the sisters vanquish a warlock in the present, his ancestor is resurrected in the past. The sisters travel back in time to protect their mother and grandmother from the ancestor, but Penny is uncertain if the sisters are telling the truth.	
"Witch Trap"	The Warren Witches	Cameron Dokey	Simon Spotlight Entertainment	May 31, 2005	Phoebe goes into the country to investigate the gold rush in order to write an article, and Piper and Paige join her project. After discovering a brooch, they are transported back to a time where witches are hunted and burned at the stake.	
"Old Family Recipe"	The Warren Witches	Diana G. Gallagher	Simon Spotlight Entertainment	May 31, 2005	While looking for her grandmother's recipe for apple pie, Piper gets caught up in a curse set out by one of Phoebe's past lives. Mistaking it for her grandmother's recipe, she bakes the pies and discovers that they curse everyone who eats them.	
"Family History"	The Warren Witches	Laura J. Burns	Simon Spotlight Entertainment	May 31, 2005	While on vacation, the sisters encounter an ancient demon who begins to change their family history. They must call on their entire lineage in order to prevent the demon from destroying their pasts.	

== Guidebooks, academic articles, and scholarly essay collections ==
Title	Author or Editor	Publisher	Date	Length	Description	Ref.
The Unofficial Charmed Internet Guide	Angela C. N. Hyatt	Lightning Rod Ltd	August 27, 1999	32 pp	The Unofficial Charmed Internet Guide focuses on Charmed's Internet presence and online fandom. It provides descriptions and the names of various fan websites.	
The Book of Shadows: The Unofficial Guide to Charmed	Ngaire E. Genge	Harmony	October 10, 2000	192 pp	The Book of Shadows: The Unofficial Guide to Charmed provides an analysis of Charmed as a television series and its roots in ancient Wicca traditions. It discusses how the religion of real Wiccan practitioners compares to that of the in-series universe, while providing behind-the-scenes information on the development of Charmed.	
Charmed! The Best Websites and Factoids (Direct Hits)	Angela C. N. Hyatt	Lightning Rod Ltd	March 15, 2002	50 pp	Charmed! The Best Websites and Factoids (Direct Hits) provides a guide to various Charmed-related websites, including the site name, URL, and a description.	
The Book of Three	Diana G. Gallagher and Paul Ruditis	Gallery Books	April 6, 2004	288 pp	The Book of Three is an exploration of the series and its mythology, and an extended overview of the history of Charmed through individual episode analysis and behind-the-scenes information.	
Charmed Book of Love Spells	Paul Ruditis	Running Press	September 7, 2004	128 pp	Charmed Book of Love Spells is a collection of love poetry inspired by the television series.	
Triquetra: The Unofficial and Unauthorized Guide to Charmed	Keith Topping	Telos Publishing	June 30, 2006	536 pp	Triquetra explores every episode, revealing the complex nature of the Halliwell sisters and their personal and supernatural lives.	
The Book of Three, Volume II	Diana G. Gallagher, Paul Ruditis, and Phyllis Ugerleider	Simon Spotlight Entertainment	November 28, 2006	302 pp	The Book of Three, Volume II is the sequel to the first book in the series; it continues its exploration of the series and its mythology, and provides an extended overview of the history of Charmed through individual episode analysis and behind-the-scenes information.	
Investigating Charmed: The Magic Power of TV	Karin Beeler and Stan Beeler	I.B.Tauris	February 5, 2008	272 pp	Investigating Charmed: The Magic Power of TV is a collection of essays which explore the show's unique brand of witchcraft and fantasy, notions of upturned sexuality, alternative forms of family life, ideas of feminism and the portrayal of female heroes. It also looks at the fans' relationship to the show, as well as the novels, fan fiction and blogs it has spurned.	
Bewitched Again: Supernaturally Powerful Women on Television, 1996–2011	Julie D. O'Reilly	McFarland & Company, Inc.	July 11, 2013	235 pp	Bewitched Again: Supernaturally Powerful Women on Television, 1996–2011 is a collection of essays on representations of supernatural women in television, with a specific emphasis on Charmed (featuring an image of the Charmed Ones, Piper, Phoebe and Paige, on the front cover).	
Totally Charmed: Demons, Whitelighters and the Power of Three	Jennifer Cruise and Leah Wilson	Smart Pop	January 6, 2015	213 pp	Totally Charmed: Demons, Whitelighters and the Power of Three is a collection of essays covering many topics written by a variety of fantasy, science fiction novelists, essayists, columnists, film critics and scientists. For instance, Debbie Viguié looks for foundations of the series in classic fairy tales, while Ruth Glick celebrates the series as a progressive step for female power. John G. Hemry compares the true power of the number three throughout history. Anne Perry considers the road to good or evil in light of the sisters' emotions: love, guilt, anger and more, whilst Kate Donovan explains why the Halliwell sisters will never truly defeat evil.	
"'When you said sea hag, did you mean like old woman hag or evil magic hag?» : The embedding of fairy tales and (post)feminism in Charmed'"	Alexis Pichard	University of Le Havre Normandie	December 2017	—N/a	This academic article describes Charmed as an example of a fairy tale and explores how it revises classic fairy tales as part of its episodes. The article questions how the show plays with gender roles and expectations as a way to portray its lead characters as feminine heroines Pichard asks whether or not Charmed could be connected with feminism, and if so, she wondering if it would be linked to "second-wave feminism, the social movement that rose in the 1960s, or rather post-feminism, the contemporary form of feminism".	

== See also ==
- Charmed comics
- List of television series made into books
