= Diana G. Gallagher =

American writer (1946–2021)

- Born: March 14, 1946; Paterson, New Jersey, U.S.
- Died: December 2, 2021 (aged 75)
- Occupation: Author
- Spouse: Martin Burke
- Writing career
- Pen name: Diana Burke; Diana Gallagher Wu
- Genres: Children's literature; young adult fiction
- Notable awards: Hugo Award for Best Fan Artist (1988)

Diana G. Gallagher (March 14, 1946 – December 2, 2021) was an American author who wrote books for children and young adults based on television series. She contributed to book series based on Buffy the Vampire Slayer, Sabrina the Teenage Witch and Charmed, among others.

Born in Paterson, New Jersey, she lived in Florida with her husband, the writer Martin Burke. She sometimes also wrote under the name Diana Burke.

Gallagher won a Hugo Award for Best Fan Artist in 1988 under the name Diana Gallagher Wu.

== Select bibliography ==
- The Alien Dark (1990)

Secret World of Alex Mack

- Alex, You're Glowing! (1995)
- Bet You Can't! (1995)
- Bad News Babysitting! (1995)
- Witch Hunt! (1995)
- Mistaken Identity! (1995)
- Go for the Gold! (1996)
- Poison in Paradise! (1996)
- Zappy Holidays! (1996)
- Frozen Stiff! (1997)
- Milady Alex! (1997)
- New Year's Revolution! (1997)
- Canine Caper! (1998)
- Gold Rush Fever! (1998)
- Paradise Lost, Paradise Regained! (1998)

Star Trek

- Deep Space Nine: Arcade (1995)
- Deep Space Nine: Day of Honor: Honor Bound (1997)
- Starfleet Academy: The Chance Factor (1997) (with Martin R Burke)

Are You Afraid of the Dark?

- Tale of the Curious Cat (1996)
- The Tale of the Pulsating Gate (1998)

Sabrina, the Teenage Witch

- Showdown at the Mall (1997)
- Halloween Havoc (1997)
- Lotsa Luck (1997)
- Now You See Her, Now You Don't (1998)
- Shamrock Shenanigans (1999)
- Bridal Bedlam (1999) (with Nancy Holder)
- Reality Check (2000)
- Wake-Up Call (2001)
- From the Horse's Mouth (2001)
- "The Interview" in Eight Spells a Week (1998)
- "The Wizard of OR" in Millennium Madness (1999)
- Salem's Tails: Dog Day Afternoon (1999) (with Mark Dubowski)
- Salem's Tails: Worth a Shot (2000)

The Mystery Files of Shelby Woo

- Takeout Stakeout (1997)
- Cut and Run (1998)

The Journey of Allen Strange

- Invasion (1998)

Buffyverse

These books are set in the fictional world of Buffy the Vampire Slayer

- Obsidian Fate (1999)
- Prime Evil (2000)
- Doomsday Deck (2000)
- Spark and Burn (2005)
- Bad Bargain (2006)
- Angel The Casefiles: Volume 2 (2004) (with Paul Ruditis)

Full House Sisters

- Matchmakers.com (2000)
- Substitute Sister (2000)
- A Dog's Life (2001)

Charmed

- Beware What You Wish (2001)
- Spirit of the Wolf (2002)
- Dark Vengeance (2002)
- Mist and Stone (2003)
- The Book of Three (2004) (with Constance M. Burge and Paul Ruditis)
- Mystic Knoll (2005)
- Hurricane Hex (2006)
- Trickery Treat (2008)

Smallville

- Shadows (2003)

Two of a Kind

- Santa Girls (2003)
- Prom Princess (2004)

Sonic X

- Spaceship Blue Typhoon (2005)

American Dreams

- What Matters Most (2005)

== Short story ==
- "Tipping Is Not the Name of a City in China"
