= Forever Charmed =

- Charmed episode
- A triquetra symbol of the Power of Three, which flashes over the screen in the final moments of the series.
- Episode no.: Season 8 Episode 22
- Directed by: James L. Conway
- Written by: Brad Kern
- Production code: 62015-08-178
- Original air date: May 21, 2006

Guest appearances
- Marnette Patterson as Christy Jenkins; Drew Fuller as Chris Halliwell; Finola Hughes as Patty Halliwell; James Read as Victor Bennett; Jennifer Rhodes as Penny Halliwell; Wes Ramsey as Adult Wyatt Halliwell; Anthony Cistaro as Dumain; Leland Crooke as Candor; Denise Dowse as Angel of Destiny; Søren Oliver as Asmodeus; Steven J. Oliver as Baliel; Ellen Geer as Old Piper; Gordon Wells as Old Leo; Ivan Sergei as Henry Mitchell; Victor Webster as Coop

Episode chronology
← Previous "Kill Billie Vol. 2"	Next → —
- Charmed (season 8)

"Forever Charmed" is the last episode of the American supernatural-drama television series Charmed, and the 178th overall. It is the second part of the double-episode series finale of the show's eighth season. The episode was written by Brad Kern and directed by James L. Conway. It was originally broadcast in the United States on May 21, 2006 on The WB. "Forever Charmed" involves time travel, nostalgic family visitations and a reprise of various important historical background situations, as well as a glimpse of the future to other progeny of The Charmed Ones. It was watched by 4.5 million American viewers, becoming the highest-rated episode of the season.

== Plot ==
After the cataclysmic battle between The Charmed Ones and the Jenkins sisters that demolished the manor and killed Phoebe (Alyssa Milano), Paige (Rose McGowan) and Christy (Marnette Patterson) in the previous episode "Kill Billie Vol. 2", Piper (Holly Marie Combs) and Leo (Brian Krause) go to Phoebe's condo where the Book of Shadows was safeguarded. While Piper and Leo look for some kind of solution to bring her sisters back to life, Billie (Kaley Cuoco) goes to Magic School, where she confronts Dumain (Anthony Cistaro), revealing that Christy is dead. Dumain suggests that she project herself back into the past to save Christy. Piper and Leo arrive at her father Victor's (James Read) apartment and Piper breaks the news of Phoebe and Paige's deaths. A horrified Victor tells them that a cupid named Coop (Victor Webster) came to his apartment looking for Phoebe. Piper then realizes that Coop's ring has the ability to travel back in time to see past loves, and summons him so she can borrow the ring.

Piper and Leo use the ring to travel back in time to change the events that lead to the deaths of Phoebe and Paige. When Piper focuses on going back in time to Phoebe, she and Leo instead end up in 1975, when Phoebe was conceived and her parents were still together. Without giving away too much information, Piper tells her parents that she and Leo are from the future and that they traveled back in time to save Phoebe and Paige from death. Her mother Patty (Finola Hughes) insists on helping them out and tells Piper to form a three-generation Power of Three with her and Grams (Jennifer Rhodes). When Piper focuses on going back in time to Grams, they instead end up 50 years in the future, to the old aged Piper and Leo, where she is the Grams. They then travel to 1982 when Grams was comforting a 10-year-old Piper. Patty did not know she was dead at that time, and after Grams faints upon seeing her, Piper is forced to tell her.

Meanwhile, back at Magic School, Billie prepares to project herself into the past. When Dumain mentions she has to focus on the time of the existence of The Triad, she suspects something is up and finally realizes she has been manipulated. Dumain tells her to go back in time and ask Christy, so she will understand. When Grams wakes up, Patty tells her that her daughters grow up to become The Charmed Ones, and immediately wants to help. Meanwhile, Billie projects herself to the manor, during the time past Billie and Christy arrive to battle with The Charmed Ones. When she tries to warn the two about what will happen, past Billie sends her flying into a wall. When the battle begins, the three-generation Power of Three—Grams, Patty and Piper—arrive to recite a spell to remove The Hollow from the past Charmed Ones and past Billie and Christy, thus stopping the battle and changing the future. Present Billie and Piper then merge into their past selves, and Billie and Christy teleport out of the manor because they no longer have the magic boosting aid of The Hollow. The Angel of Destiny (Denise Dowse) arrives to take Leo back again because the battle did not occur. The future Wyatt (Wes Ramsey) and Chris (Drew Fuller) appear in the manor, revealing that someone has altered their future.

When Billie tells Christy that The Triad and Dumain have been working together to use them to take out The Charmed Ones, Christy remains undeterred by this revelation and is determined to carry out their destiny of killing The Charmed Ones, with or without Billie. She realizes that Christy has become a killer, and returns to the manor to side with The Charmed Ones and ask for their forgiveness. Meanwhile, future Chris and Wyatt explain that Wyatt lost his powers in the middle of a demon fight, and Billie reveals that Dumain convinced her and Christy to steal baby Wyatt's powers to summon The Hollow to kill The Charmed Ones. When Coop arrives at the manor, Wyatt accidentally calls him Uncle Coop, letting it slip that he and Phoebe are together in the future. While the sisters and Grams go to Phoebe's condo to work on vanquishing potions, Patty and the boys visit present Victor's apartment and is shocked to find out that they are divorced. Christy tells Dumain that Billie has abandoned them, but believes there is a way to revive The Triad without her. When Paige's husband Henry (Ivan Sergei) arrives at the condo, Grams finds out that he is a mortal and is not pleased. When Coop confesses his love to Phoebe, she does not handle it well, believing that it is a forbidden love. She gives him his ring and returns to her sisters. Dumain then shimmers in and grabs Coop and the ring.

When Phoebe's calls for Coop fail, future Wyatt and Chris reveal that Coop was sent by The Elders to make up for all the events they put her through as a Charmed One, and that it is not a forbidden love. They also explain that in the future all she has to do is think about Coop to summon him. He then appears in great pain and reveals that Dumain took his ring so he and Christy can travel back in time. While she realizes it's too late to stop them, Billie has the ability to time travel too. When present Dumain and Christy arrive in the past, they warn The Triad to convince past Christy and Billie to invoke The Hollow before The Charmed Ones. Present Billie and The Charmed Ones arrive a moment later thanks to Billie focusing on Christy to vanquish The Triad, and Piper blows up the past and present versions of Dumain, leaving Christy without any allies. When Billie begs Christy to come back to the good side, Christy is enraged and launches a fireball at her sister, which Billie deflects with telekinesis, accidentally vanquishing Christy. Billie immediately collapses in tears while the sisters feel her pain. A family reunion then takes place in the sun room of the manor and Wyatt reveals that he has his powers back. The Angel of Destiny returns with Leo and reveals that this was how the battle was supposed to end. Patty also reveals that she now knows of Prue's (Shannen Doherty) death thanks to Victor, and she understands and accepts her death because of Paige's existence. Coop takes Grams, Patty, Chris and Wyatt back to their own times and erases their memories of the recent events.

The next day, Piper brings the Book of Shadows downstairs to Phoebe and Paige, and they each write a reflection of what has happened in the past years so future generations will know. Phoebe writes that over the last eight years, so much was gained and lost and that her life is really just beginning, after finding out that Coop is her true love. A flash-forward reveals that Phoebe and Coop are married and have two daughters, and that Phoebe is pregnant with their third child. Billie, too, has gotten over Christy's death and she is seen as a babysitter for Phoebe's daughters. It also shows that Phoebe continues working at the Bay Mirror and ends up writing a self-help book on finding love. Paige writes about her and Henry's lives. It is shown in flashforwards that she accepts her role as a Whitelighter, aiding many witches and future Whitelighters that include her nieces and nephews. It also shows that Paige and Henry have three children, twin daughters and a son. Piper writes down how Paige passed on all that she learned about being a witch to her and Phoebe's kids. In a flash of the future, Piper and Leo have their third child, a daughter named Melinda. It also shows that Piper has her own restaurant, and Leo is back to teaching at Magic School. As Piper is reciting her passage, the future grandmother Piper is reading the passage to her granddaughter, Prudence. Piper's last message in the book is "Though we've certainly had our struggles and heartaches over the years, we're a family of survivors and we will always be, which is why we've truly been Charmed." Prudence asks her to read it again, but the future Piper says she needs to go rest and that she can read it herself because the book will be hers one day. The future Piper and Leo then head upstairs while family photos hanging on the wall are shown. The episode ends with the rest of the Halliwell grandchildren running into the manor before Prudence closes the door with telekinesis, the same way Prue did at the end of the first episode, "Something Wicca This Way Comes".

== Reception ==
In 2016, Gavin Hetherington of SpoilerTV reflected on the series finale on its 10th anniversary on May 21. He wrote that "Forever Charmed" was the best episode of the season, and that it was "the best way they could have ended, really, was to surround the finale with family - one of the main reasons people fell in love with the show." He said that he felt let down by Prue's absence, and that "it will always kill me that she never appeared, or even had her photo on the wall". He concludes by saying "could they have really had a better ending?"
