= CHUD.com =

American film review website

- Website type: Film review
- Available in: English
- Headquarters: United States
- Owner: Nick Nunziata
- Founder: Nick Nunziata
- Editor: Nick Nunziata
- Website: chud.com
- Commercial: Yes
- Current status: Inactive (as of 10/1/2020)

CHUD.com, a backronym of Cinematic Happenings Under Development, was an American film news website created by Nick Nunziata in 1999 which is currently owned by Bigfoot Entertainment. Its name and look were inspired by 1984's minor cult film C.H.U.D. (Cannibalistic Humanoid Underground Dwellers).

In addition to the film reviews and news it hosted a movie of the day column. It was one of the longest-running sites of its kind.
