= Carlos Granda =

American news reporter

- Born: Florida, U.S.
- Education: University of South Florida (B.A.)
- Occupation: Television journalist
- Employers: WINK-TV; WLTV (1985–1987); WPLG-TV (1987–1990); WABC-TV (1990–1993); WNBC-TV (1993–1995); WFOR-TV (1995–1998); KABC-TV (1998-present)

Carlos Granda is a reporter for KABC-TV News in Los Angeles.

== Background ==
Carlos Granda holds a Bachelor's degree in Mass Communications and Broadcast Journalism from the University of South Florida. He became interested in journalism after watching Walter Cronkite on the news. When he was a child, Carlos Granda was impressed by how articulate and poised Walter Cronkite was.

== Career ==
Granda began his career in television news at WINK-TV, the CBS affiliate in Fort Myers, Florida where he joined as an associate producer. Later he became a full-time reporter for the station.

Moving to Miami-based WLTV in 1985, Granda covered a number of major events, including Queen Elizabeth's visit to the Bahamas, the centennial of the Statue of Liberty in New York, and the crash of a Delta flight in Dallas.

After two years at WLTV, Granda moved in 1987 to cover Central American issues for ABC's then-Miami affiliate, WPLG-TV.

In 1990, Granda moved to New-York based WABC-TV to work as a general assignment reporter and fill-in anchor for morning edtions of Channel 7 Eyewitness News. Then in late 1993, he moved to WNBC-TV to become the New Jersey correspondent for News 4 New York.

Granda returned to Miami in 1995 to become an anchor at CBS owned-and-operated station WFOR-TV. He joined KABC-TV as a general assignment reporter in April 1998.

At KABC-TV, Granda has covered some of the biggest stories in Southern California. He has reported on the 2000 Democratic and Republican Conventions, the custody dispute pertaining to Elián González, the September 11 attacks on the World Trade Center, and several stories about the Al Qaeda prisoners at the Guantanamo Bay Naval Base in Cuba.

== Awards ==
Granda has been nominated for five Emmy awards. He won an Emmy for his series on the homeless called "My Home is the Street".
