= Paul Ruditis =

American author

- Born: Philadelphia, Pennsylvania, U.S.
- Education: West Chester University
- Occupation: Author

Paul Ruditis is an American author.

== Early life ==
Ruditis was born and raised in Philadelphia. He attended West Chester University where he majored in Theatre Arts with a directing emphasis. After graduation, he moved to Los Angeles where he began working at Paramount Pictures where he worked as a tour guide and usher. Eventually, he took a position working in the studio's licensing department where he worked his way up to middle management before quitting to focus on writing.

== Biography ==
Ruditis' first publication was in a Buffy the Vampire Slayer short story collection, which was being edited by a friend. Since then he has published tie-in novels and official guides to many hit television shows such as Buffy the Vampire Slayer, Charmed, Angel, Queer as Folk, Frasier, The L Word, Star Trek, Roswell, The West Wing, Alias, Prison Break, Bones, The Brady Bunch, The Hardy Boys, The Girls Next Door and Sabrina, The Teenage Witch. He also wrote a guide to the film G.I. Joe: The Rise of Cobra.

He has also published original fiction including the DRAMA! series and the controversial young adult book Rainbow Party.

In 2010, he was hired by Zenecscope Entertainment to be the lead writer on Charmed, a comic series based on the television series of the same name. The comic features an all new storyline set after the series' conclusion and has to date been very popular with the first issue selling out in its first three weeks. For Issues 0-3 Ruditis co-authored the series with Zenescope veteran Raven Gregory but from Issue 4 onwards he penned the comics on his own.

== Works ==
=== TV series-linked fiction ===
- Buffy the Vampire Slayer
  - "The Show Must Go On" (short story in How I Survived My Summer Vacation)
- Charmed
- Roswell
- Alias
- Sabrina, the Teenage Witch
- Star Trek: Enterprise
- Star Trek: Voyager

=== Official guides ===
- Charmed
- Buffy the Vampire Slayer (TV series)
- Angel
- Sabrina, the Teenage Witch
- Alias
- The West Wing
- Bones
- Prison Break
- Queer as Folk
- The Brady Bunch
- The Hardy Boys
- G.I. Joe: The Rise of Cobra
- Star Trek: Voyager

=== Comics ===
- Charmed Season 9 Comics
  - Charmed Issue #0 - Sourcebook (with Raven Gregory)
  - Charmed Issue #1 - Charmed Lives (with Raven Gregory)
  - Charmed Issue #2 - No Rest For the Wicca (with Raven Gregory)
  - Charmed Issue #3 - Innocents Lost (with Raven Gregory)
  - Charmed Issue #4 - Mortal Enemies
  - Charmed Issue #5 - Unnatural Resources

Charmed Volume 1 (collecting issues 0–5)

  - Charmed Issue #6 - Morality Bites Back
  - Charmed Issue #7 - The Heir Up There
  - Charmed Issue #8 - Oh, Henry
  - Charmed Issue #9 - Desperately Seeking Piper (temporary title until issue is published)
  - Charmed Issue #10 - Three Little Wiccans

=== Other fiction ===
- Rainbow Party (2005) is a controversial novel aimed at the teen market (ages 14 and up) about teens and oral sex.
- DRAMA! The Four Dorothys is the first in the DRAMA! series
- DRAMA! Everyone's a Critic is the second in the DRAMA! series
- DRAMA! Show, Don't Tell is the third in the DRAMA! series
- DRAMA! Entrances and Exits is the fourth in the DRAMA! series
