= Prue Halliwell =

Charmed character

- Charmed character
- Shannen Doherty as Prue
- First appearance: "Something Wicca This Way Comes" (1.01)
- Last appearance: The Reason (10.20)
- Created by: Constance M. Burge
- Portrayed by: Shannen Doherty; Emmalee Thompson (Young Prue)

In-universe information
- Full name: Prudence Halliwell
- Aliases: Ms. Hellfire; Manny Hanks; Patience (comic book series)
- Nickname: Prue
- Species: Charmed One; Witch
- Gender: Female
- Family: Patty Halliwell (mother; deceased); Victor Bennett (father); Piper Halliwell (younger sister); Phoebe Halliwell (younger sister); Paige Matthews (younger maternal half-sister)
- Spouses: Zile (husband; deceased)
- Relatives: Charlotte Warren (ancestor; deceased); Melinda Warren (ancestor; deceased); Allen Halliwell (grandfather; deceased); Penny Halliwell (grandmother; deceased)
- Notable Powers: Telekinesis; Astral Projection

Prudence "Prue" Halliwell is a fictional character from the American television series Charmed, played by Shannen Doherty from October 7, 1998, until May 17, 2001. She is the eldest daughter of Patty Halliwell and Victor Bennett. The character was created by Constance M. Burge, who based Prue on her older sister. Prue is introduced into the series as the eldest sister to Piper Halliwell (Holly Marie Combs) and Phoebe Halliwell (Alyssa Milano). She is one of the first original featured leads and more specifically, a Charmed One – one of the most powerful witches of all time. Prue initially possesses the power to move objects with her mind by channeling telekinesis through her eyes. As the series progresses, she learns how to channel her telekinesis through her hands and gains the power of astral projection, the ability to be in two places at once. Prue also develops martial arts skills and becomes an effective hand-to-hand fighter like Phoebe.

Prue is portrayed as the oldest, responsible, strong, "kick-ass sister" and "leader of the group." During her three seasons on Charmed, she is regarded as the strongest and most powerful witch of the Halliwell sisters in seasons 1-3*. Prue's storylines have mostly revolved around her protecting innocents and defeating the forces of evil in San Francisco with her sisters, as well as leading a normal life as an appraiser for an auction house and later as a professional photographer for a magazine company. She also has romantic relationships with her old high school flame Inspector Andy Trudeau (Ted King) in season one, and fellow auction house employee Jack Sheridan (Lochlyn Munro) in season two. In the third season, Prue is forced to marry the warlock Zile (Tom O'Brien) in a dark marriage ceremony, but their marriage soon ends after he is vanquished. In the season three finale "All Hell Breaks Loose", Prue is attacked by Shax, a powerful demonic assassin sent by The Source of All Evil, ending the season on a cliffhanger. After Doherty departed the series, this attack was revealed to be fatal. She was replaced in season four by Rose McGowan, who played the long-lost younger half-sister Paige Matthews.

The character received a positive reception from television critics, who praised her strong persona and Doherty's performance. Doherty received two Saturn Award nominations in 1999 and 2000, for Best Actress on Television for her portrayal of Prue. In 2007, AOL TV ranked Prue at number nine on their list of the Top TV Witches. In addition to the television series, the character has also appeared in numerous expanded universe material, such as the Charmed novels and its comic book adaptation.

== Casting and development ==
In 1998, The WB began searching for a drama series, and looked to Spelling Television, which had produced the network's most successful series 7th Heaven, to create it. Expanding on the popularity of supernatural-themed dramas, the production company explored forms of mythology to find mythological characters they could focus on with contemporary storytelling. In order to create the series, Constance M. Burge was hired as the creator as she was under contract with 20th Century Fox and Spelling Television after conceiving the drama Savannah.

The character of Prue Halliwell was conceived by Burge, who wrote the pilot script for Charmed. The pilot script was based around three mismatched sisters who are initially based on Burge and her two older sisters, Laura and Edie Burge. Prue is based on Burge's older sister Laura. On creating Prue, Burge stated "my older sister, Laura, is very strong, very driven and so I attributed the characteristics that my sister Laura has to the character Prue." Executive producer Brad Kern claimed Prue was written into the series as "the older sister, the kick-ass sister. She was the tough one. She was probably the most skeptical about the magic up top, but ultimately became the most powerful of [the sisters]." Doherty stated that the character "had a sense of responsibility that she felt towards her family and she was very nurturing and maternal and giving".

When the series was in its first development stages, executive producer Aaron Spelling had always known who he wanted for the role of Prue: Shannen Doherty, an actress from a previous Spelling Television series, Beverly Hills, 90210. Doherty, already devoted to the project, pitched the idea to her best friend, former Picket Fences actress Holly Marie Combs, whom she and Spelling wanted for the role of Piper Halliwell. Doherty played the role of Prue in a 28-minute test pilot (the "unaired pilot", never aired on television) alongside Combs and actress Lori Rom, who played the youngest sister Phoebe Halliwell. Rom quit the series and a new pilot was filmed with former Who's the Boss? actress Alyssa Milano, who took over the role of Phoebe.

== Departure ==
In May 2001, it was officially announced that Doherty would be departing Charmed. Following the announcement, rumors circulated that the reason behind Doherty's departure was because of a feud with Milano. Doherty told Entertainment Tonight that "there was too much drama on the set and not enough passion for the work", and that there were never any problems between her and Combs. During an interview on Watch What Happens Live in 2013, Milano spoke about the rumored feud between her and Doherty, after a caller asked for the truth behind Doherty's departure. Milano said, "I don't know if she got fired, we never really found out what happened. I can tell you that we were on the air with her for three years and there were definitely some rough days. Holly and Shannen were best friends for like 10 years before the show started so it was very much sort of like high school. I would hope that in our thirties it wouldn't feel like that anymore."

The producers originally considered recasting the role of Prue with a different actress. Actresses Soleil Moon Frye, Irene Molloy and Denise Richards were rumored to be possible replacements. Spelling even approached Tiffani Thiessen, who replaced Doherty on Beverly Hills, 90210, and Jennifer Love Hewitt. However, both Thiessen and Hewitt declined the role. Producers then decided to kill off Prue and replace her with a long-lost younger half-sister named Paige Matthews (played by Rose McGowan), in favor of having "a fresh face" join the series. The producers had to re-cut the season three cliffhanger to explain Prue's sudden disappearance. Following Doherty's departure from the series, all photographs of Prue in the Halliwell sisters' home were never seen again and she never appeared in any flashback scenes. In an interview with TVLine marking the ten year anniversary of the series finale, executive producer Brad Kern said that he "tried like crazy to get her in flashbacks and to have photographs of her on the walls," but they could not afford to pay Doherty per-episode fee to use her image. Kern said that he regrets not being able to include a photo of Prue in the series finale's final montage, but added it would have been "impossible to accomplish" because "it was going to cost us a lot of money." Doherty revealed that she was asked to return for the series finale, but she declined the offer as she did not like the way the producers wanted to bring Prue back, stating it was "just not authentic", "nothing interesting or good", not "true to the character", and that "it didn't feel right." On such a return of hers, she stated that "the idea was floated by her". However, Kern commented that "there was no talk about bringing [Doherty] back physically" because they did not believe she would ever return or that the network would want her to. Kern felt that Doherty would not have returned because "there were a lot of internal issues that led up to her leaving...on a lot of different people's sides."

== Appearances ==
=== Television ===
Prue is depicted as the eldest Halliwell sister on Charmed, portrayed by Shannen Doherty in the first 66 episodes of the series as well as the unaired pilot. At the start of season one (1998–99), six months have passed since the death of her grandmother, Penny Halliwell (Jennifer Rhodes). After ending her engagement to Roger (Matthew Ashford), Prue moves back into her family's Victorian Manor with her middle sister Piper (Holly Marie Combs), and they are later joined by their youngest sister Phoebe (Alyssa Milano). On the night of Phoebe's return, she finds a book called the Book of Shadows within the Manor's attic. After Phoebe unknowingly recites aloud what turns out to be an incantation from the book, the three sisters each receive a magical power and discover their destiny as The Charmed Ones – the most powerful good witches the world has ever known. Gaining the power to "move things with her mind", Prue battles with maintaining control of her newfound powers and keeping her identity as a witch secret.

Due to the magical interferences in both her work and personal life, Prue finds it difficult to rekindle a relationship with her old high school flame Inspector Andy Trudeau (T.W. King) and stay on top of her new job as an appraiser for Buckland's Auction House. Throughout the first season, Prue and her sisters face off against various warlocks and demons who aim to steal their powers or harm innocents. In the first-season finale, Andy is killed trying protect her from a demonic foe.

The show's second season (1999–2000) opens with Prue's continual struggle to deal with Andy's death. Prue feels responsible, and contemplates giving up on witchcraft entirely, but eventually decides to continue her destiny as a witch and protector of the innocent with help from her sisters. Prue later experiences growth in her magical abilities when she develops the power to "be in two places at once" via Astral Projection, and learns to open herself up to the potential of love again through a courtship with fellow Buckland's employee Jack Sheridan (Lochlyn Munro) and a romantic fling with ex-con Bane Jessup (Antonio Sabato, Jr.). She eventually quits her job at Buckland's to pursue her lifelong dream of being a professional photographer. Prue subsequently gets a job as a photographer for 415 Magazine. In the season two finale, Prue and her sisters discover that the many attacks on their lives by evil beings have been orchestrated by a demonic force known as The Council.

By season three (2000–01), learning of the new evil The Triad (who have replaced The Council), Prue becomes determined to prepare herself for any further attacks of evil on herself, her sisters and any future innocents in which to protect. Throughout the season Prue displays martial arts skills, strengthening her powers and researching, finding and destroying demons. Her fight and devotion as a Charmed One and fulfilling their destiny results in her becoming what has been coined as a "SuperWitch". Prue and her sisters eventually learn that the demon Belthazor and The Triad work for an even greater evil, The Source of All Evil, the leader of the demonic realm known as The Underworld. After Prue and Piper later discover that Cole Turner (Julian McMahon), who is actually Belthazor, faked his death with Phoebe's help, the revelation causes a rift in their sisterly relationship. Later, after being forced to marry the warlock, Zile (Tom O'Brien) in a dark marriage ceremony, Prue comes to understand Phoebe's draw to Cole's darker half. While the two sisters mend their relationship, Prue distrusts Cole for some time. Midway through season three, Prue also makes amends with her estranged father, Victor Bennett (James Read) who left the family shortly after their mother's death.

During the season three finale, Prue and Piper unwittingly expose themselves as witches to the world after being caught on camera by a local news crew fighting with The Source's personal assassin Shax. In the aftermath of the exposure, Piper is shot by a crazed Wiccan fanatic who wanted to join the sisters' coven. Prue frantically tries to get Piper to a hospital, but is thwarted by the crowd of media in her way. Prue disregards the laws of magic and uses her powers against everyone in her way to save her sister's life. Prue gets Piper to a hospital bed where Piper tells her she's "so cold", and dies in Prue's arms. Prue, overcome with grief and rage, uses her powers and fighting skills to hold off a S.W.A.T. team attempting to take her down. Cradling her sister's body, she promises to "fix" her death.

In order to save her sister's life, Prue orders Piper's husband Leo Wyatt (Brian Krause) to find Phoebe and pass on a deal to The Source to turn back time. This would reset the exposure of magic and undo Piper's death. The Source agrees, knowing that he plans to double cross her in the end as Phoebe will be immune to the time reset while in The Underworld. In the end, Phoebe will not be able to warn her sisters' of the assassin's attack and he will kill her himself. Time is reversed to the sisters' first encounter with Shax. However, Phoebe no longer answers when Prue calls for help, as she was never sent back in time. The season ends on a cliffhanger with Piper and Prue left for dead after losing in the fight against Shax. Meanwhile, Phoebe remains trapped in The Underworld.

In the premiere of season four (2001–02) "Charmed Again (Part 1)", it is revealed that Prue could not be saved in time from the fatal wounds she suffered at Shax's hands in the season three finale. Although the character is never shown again, Piper attempts numerous spells to resurrect Prue to no avail, and when she comes into contact with their grandmother, it is revealed that Prue is still struggling to adjust to being in the afterlife and that she is being helped to process her death by both Penny and the girls' mother Patty Halliwell (Finola Hughes). Penny also reveals to Piper that Prue cannot be summoned back to Earth because seeing Prue would not allow the sisters to grieve and finally move on. After going through phases of anger, denial, and depression, Piper accepts that Prue is really gone, and attends her funeral. This results in Phoebe having a premonition to save a young girl at the funeral and later discovering her identity as their younger half-sister Paige Matthews (Rose McGowan), a love child between their mother and her whitelighter, who was kept secret because of her whitelighter heritage. With the addition of Paige, Piper and Phoebe are able to reconstitute the Power of Three and avenge Prue's death in vanquishing Shax.

Also this season, the new Power of Three call on Prue's spirit to twice vanquish The Source – both in his original incarnation and that of his next incarnation, Cole. In the fifth season (2002–03), Prue is briefly seen when Phoebe and Paige visit the past memory of Piper's wedding. However, Prue's face is never shown and only her back is seen due to copyright laws regarding Doherty's image. During the seventh season (2004–05) finale, it is revealed that after being asked for help from her sisters, Prue had taught Leo how to use astral projection despite being "really protective of it". Piper, Phoebe and Paige later utilize the power of astral projection to defeat the threat of the demon Zankou (Oded Fehr). This is indicated by Piper stating "Thank you Prue," once Piper, Phoebe and Paige reflect on the successful attack. The season then ends with Manor door being shut by a telekinetic force, implying Prue closed it from the afterlife.

=== Literature ===
As one of the central characters of the series, Prue appears extensively in Charmed literature. These appearances are most prominent in the first 10 books of the series of novels. The novels follow no strict continuity with the series or each other, and are often considered to be non-canon. However, the television series producers have final approval of everything in the novels, which could indicate the literature fitting into the established canon of the series and the so-called "Charmed universe". Prue's first appearance in Charmed literature takes place within the novel The Power of Three by Eliza Willard on November 1, 1999, which acts as a novelised version of the series' premiere episode, "Something Wicca This Way Comes". Her last appearance in a Charmed novel takes place within Beware What You Wish by Diana G. Gallagher on July 31, 2001.

In 2010, Charmed gained an officially licensed continuation in the form of a comic book, which is often billed as Charmed: Season 9. The series is published monthly by Zenescope Entertainment. While Shannen Doherty's image of Prue has yet to actually be seen in the comics, the character is seen as another person after taking over their body. In the twelfth issue of the comic, The Charmed Offensive, seven years after Prue's death, Penny Halliwell informs the sisters that Prue has reincarnated into her next life, as her destiny was not completed when she died. However, it is later revealed in the issue that Penny had lied to the girls, mainly because she has no idea where Prue is. Later, Penny and her daughter Patty Halliwell task Cole to locate the missing Prue in exchange for helping him find peace in the afterlife. In the sixteenth issue of the comic, Cole finds her in Salem as another witch named Patience. In the seventeenth issue of the comics, Paige looks for a witch named Sarah at a Salem house; however, she meets Cole who won't let her in. Despite his pleas, she orbs into the house where she meets Patience (Prue) and the two touch causing their powers to send them away. After recovering, Patience tells Paige that she is Prue. At first, Paige doesn't believe her, but they go to the manor where after seven years, Prue, Piper, and Phoebe are finally reunited with a hug.

In spite of the reunion, Prue's presence causes the sisters' powers to go haywire. Because the Charmed prophecy never spoke of a "Power of Four", the reunion of the four sisters causes their individual and collective powers to go out of control. To diffuse the chaos brought upon by the presence of the four sisters, Paige volunteers to relinquish her powers so that Prue can rejoin her sisters in the "Power of Three". Cole, however, steps in and informs Prue that the real reason she remained tied to the "Power of Three" and unable to move on in the afterlife was because she refused to truly let go of her destiny with her sisters. Realizing that her time as a Charmed One has passed, as she no longer inhabits the body of a true Warren witch, Prue instead surrenders her Warren powers so that Paige will be the only sister with the power to move things with her mind. Despite losing her active powers, Prue retains her status as witch and keeps the basic witch powers that allow her to cast spells and brew potions. Prue later returns to Salem, Massachusetts with Cole, who will help her train new witches to atone for his evil past.

== Powers and abilities ==
=== Magical powers ===
In Charmed it is revealed that magical witches can develop and master a variety of magical skills and powers which include scrying, spell casting, and brewing potent potions. As a magical witch, Prue can utilize scrying, a divination art form that allows one to locate a missing object or person. Prue can also cast spells, often written in iambic pentameter or as a rhyming couplet, to influence others or the world around her. She can also brew potions, most often used to vanquish foes or to achieve other magical feats similar to the effects of a spell. Prue also possesses the powers of telekinesis and astral projection; however, in the comic book continuation, she chooses to lose these abilities because her and Paige's co-existence is unbalancing the Power of Three. Prue was also often described as the most powerful of the Charmed Ones in seasons 1-3.

==== Telekinesis ====
At the start of the series, it is revealed that Prue has the power to move objects and people with her mind using telekinesis. While Prue's telekinetic powers work best with a direct line of sight, she appears to simply need only an intimate knowledge of the object's location in order to manipulate its movement. For instance, in the pilot episode, "Something Wicca This Way Comes", Prue is able to move the ink from her ex-fiancée Roger's pen, although it is mostly concealed in his shirt pocket. Later, while outside Roger's office, she curls her fingers in anger, which causes Roger's tie to tighten its hold around his neck. In the same episode, Prue also displays telematerialization as a second method for which she can move objects with her mind. After Prue telekinetically slides a creamer container towards her from across the bar in frustration, she proceeds to transfer a portion of the cream from its container by telematerializing the cream directly into her coffee without it going through the air or space between. The series premiere is the only instance in which Prue displays teleportation powers on-screen; however, she later uses this power again in the comics.

In the Charmed series, certain magical powers are attached to emotional triggers, regardless, all powers can be affected by the user's emotions. For Prue, the emotional trigger for her telekinesis is anger and frustration. This emotion is channeled to initially unlock and control her powers, which can only be focused by squinting her eyes for the majority of the first season. In episode nineteen of season one, "Out of Sight", Prue learns how to channel her telekinesis through her hands as well. Later in the series, she obtains enough control over her powers in order to move objects with a mere crook or twitch of a single finger. The limits of Prue's telekinetic powers are unclear, but she appears to be able to move up to 400 pounds (181.4 kg) with her mind, sufficient to lift and throw two normal-sized adults with her powers.

In the season two episode "Morality Bites", Prue travels ten years into the future from the year 1999 and inhabits her future self's body. In the episode, Prue discovers that in ten years time from 1999, her telekinesis becomes several times stronger when she telekinetically blasts out an entire wall of the attic with one swift hand gesture. After returning to the present, Prue never realizes the growth of this level of power before her death at the end of the third season. However, in the comics, after possessing the body of Patience, Prue's telekinetic powers did evolve to an advanced level — she was able to lift a car with her mind, levitate a chalk drawing off its surface, and even manipulate the chalk drawing to the extent where it exploded. She was even able to telekinetically hold her half-sister Paige in place and the latter admitted that she couldn't orb out of this.

==== Astral Projection ====
In the season two episode "Ms. Hellfire", Prue's powers expand allowing her to move her body to another location in the form of astral projection. This power developed from an intense desire to be in two places at once. While astrally projecting, Prue's physical body falls unconscious while her astral body appears in a new location in corporeal form. Unlike traditional astral projection, 'Astral Prue' is able to interact with the physical world. Prue displays the ability to astrally project across vast distances, regardless of her lack of familiarity with the location she is projecting to. However, she never displays the ability to astrally project across worlds. It is also revealed that Prue is unable to access her power of telekinesis while she is astrally projecting. In season three of the series, it is revealed that injuries sustained by Prue will not appear on her astral body. In the season three episode "Primrose Empath", after Prue is temporarily cursed with the power of empathy, she channels the emotions she feels to enhance her own magical powers, which enable her to astrally project emotions into other people as well as briefly utilize her astral and physical bodies at the same time.

=== Other abilities ===
During her time on the series, Prue displays an efficiency in the Latin language and displays an expertise on various artifacts from a number of art forms and cultures throughout history. In season two, Prue begins taking classes in self-defense with her sister Phoebe. She gradually becomes an effective hand-to-hand fighter with her skills on par with Phoebe's. Her skills in hand-to-hand combat advanced to the point where Prue is capable of besting multiple adversaries in season three, most notably demonic wrestlers, the demon Vinceres, vampire-like demons known as Seekers, and two S.W.A.T. team members. Prue is also skilled in the art of photography, which she later turns into her full-time profession.

== Death count ==
During the run of the series and her life as a Charmed One, Prue died three times.

Season	Episode No.	Episode Title	Cause of Death	Revival
1	20	"The Power of Two"	Died from a potion she drank to try to vanquish a ghost.	Andy gave her CPR.
2	22	"Be Careful What You Witch For"	Stabbed by the dragon warlock.	Phoebe had the genie reset the wishes. She then made a wish for Prue to be alive again.
3	22	"All Hell Breaks Loose"	Thrown through a wall by Shax.	Not revived in the television series. Comic book series revealed that her spirit failed to move on and she started a new life in the body of the formerly comatose Patience.

== Reception ==
In 1999, Doherty was nominated for a Saturn Award for Best Actress on Television for her portrayal of Prue. She received the same nomination the following year. Doherty and Milano's rumored off-screen feud earned them a nomination for Best Fight at the 2001 Wand Awards.

Terry Kelleher of People magazine labeled Prue "the serious one" out of the three Halliwell sisters. Michael Abernethy of PopMatters described Prue as "pragmatic" and noted that Doherty's performance in Charmed had "the hard edge" that was seen in her previous roles, further adding that she had "matured from a bitchy teenager into an assertive confident woman." Ken Tucker of Entertainment Weekly commented that Doherty's presence on the show was one of the main things that made it interesting, writing "Perennially crabby, delivering her lines as if she has contempt for them...curt, cranky Doherty gives Charmed its kick." Newsday's Steve Parks wrote that Doherty being cast as a witch was a "perfect" idea, due to her rumored poor off-screen behaviour. Kristin Sample of AOL TV felt that Prue had the "best powers" and was "the bitchiest" witch out of the three sisters, further adding that Doherty "quite possibly could be a real life witch." In his review of the pilot episode, Rob Owen of the Pittsburgh Post-Gazette commented that "Charmed is Doherty's show plain and simple. Her behaviour on and off screen may not always be charming, but she excels at this sort of formidable, prickly character." CNN's Joshua Levs named Prue the "uber-responsible older sister" and felt that Doherty made her "somewhat plausible."

Entertainment Weekly's Kate Ward added that she "gained an appreciation" for Doherty after seeing her on Charmed, writing "Despite omnipresent rumors of her poor off-screen behavior, it's been difficult for me to think of Doherty as anything but charming." In her review of the first season, Karyn L. Barr of the same publication wrote that Prue was one of the reasons it was "spellbinding". Rachel Day of Geek Speak praised Doherty's acting on Charmed and wrote that she deserved her two Saturn Award nominations. Day noted that Doherty's "particularly outstanding" performances were in the season two episodes "Witch Trial" and "Murphy's Luck". SpoilerTV's Gavin Hetherington named Prue "one of television's most influential witches" and wrote that her death in the season three finale was "one of the best in television history" that "forever changed the course of the show." Angelica Bastien of Bustle called Prue "the superior sister" and added that she preferred the show's first three seasons as she felt "Charmed got pretty bad" in the seasons after Prue died. Brett Cullum of DVD Verdict wrote that Prue was "the pragmatic no-nonsense leader of the group" during the first three seasons and she was "never afraid to lay down the law." He further added, "Not only was Shannen a pretty good witch, but nobody gives good bitch quite like her. She's infamous for being hard to work with, but she's got a charisma the show needed. She knew how to make Prudence strong and vulnerable all at once, and they relied on her to be the wise leader who put her fist down when necessary." Hugh Armitage of Digital Spy felt that "Prue's death was handled badly", further adding that "it never made sense that she would vanish" from the show completely, as "Prue never showed up in spirit form" and was not featured in any photographs displayed in the sisters' home.

== Cultural impact ==
In 2007, AOL TV ranked Prue at number 9 on their list of Top TV Witches. The following year, she was ranked at number 10 on the same list. Prue was included in TVLine's list of "Shocking TV Deaths", while Glamour magazine included her in their list of favourite witches from TV. Prue's death was included on io9's list of the "Top 10 Most Shocking TV Deaths", with Meredith Woerner stating that her permanent death was shocking considering the show's light-hearted tone and forever changed the family dynamic.

Doherty and her character have been referenced in television shows and films due to her portrayal as a witch in Charmed. In the 2000 parody film, Shriek If You Know What I Did Last Friday the Thirteenth, Barbara Primesuspect (Julie Benz) is said to be yelling "Charmed my ass!" at Doherty, who does not appear on-screen. In an episode of the teen comedy-drama series Popular, entitled "The Shocking Possession of Harrison John", Josh Ford (Bryce Johnson) asks George Austin (Anthony Montgomery) who is Michael Bernardino's (Ron Lester) "favorite hottie witch" on Charmed and George says it is Prue. In the episode "Cursed" of sitcom So Notorious, Tori Spelling and Sasan (Zachary Quinto) discuss who has put a curse on her and Sasan says, "It's Shannen! She knows all that witchcraft from Charmed." The reference in So Notorious was meant as a joke to Doherty's rumored poor off-screen behavior when she and Spelling both starred together in Beverly Hills, 90210. In his review of the television series Witches of East End being too similar to Charmed, Christian Cintron of Hollywood.com noted that Julia Ormond's character Joanna Beauchamp seemed "a lot like...Doherty's type-A character, Prue."

== See also ==
- Woman warrior
