= List of Charmed episodes =

Charmed is an American television series created by Constance M. Burge. In the United States, Charmed premiered on The WB on October 7, 1998 and ended on May 21, 2006, with 178 episodes. Charmed originally aired on Wednesday nights at 9:00 pm, before moving to Thursday nights for its second, third and fourth seasons. For the fifth season, the series moved to Sunday nights at 8:00 pm and remained there until its eighth and final season.

The first episode, "Something Wicca This Way Comes", garnered 7.7 million viewers and broke the record for the highest-rated debut episode for The WB. During its fifth season, Charmed became the highest-rated Sunday night program in The WB's history. By the end of its eighth season, Charmed had become the second-longest drama broadcast by The WB and broke the record for the longest running hour-long television series featuring all female leads, later overtaken in 2012 by Desperate Housewives.

== Series overview ==
Season	Episodes	Originally released		Viewers (millions)	Rank	Network Rank
Season	Episodes	First released	Last released	Viewers (millions)	Rank	Network Rank
1	22	October 7, 1998	May 26, 1999	5.4	118	2
2	22	September 30, 1999	May 18, 2000	5.2	120	2
3	22	October 5, 2000	May 17, 2001	4.9	117	2
4	22	October 4, 2001	May 16, 2002	4.2	129	6
5	23	September 22, 2002	May 11, 2003	4.5	128	6
6	23	September 28, 2003	May 16, 2004	4.3	154	4
7	22	September 12, 2004	May 22, 2005	3.5	132	7
8	22	September 25, 2005	May 21, 2006	3.5	132	7

== Episodes ==
=== Season 1 (1998–1999) ===
No. overall	No. in season	Title	Directed by	Written by	Original release date	Prod. code	U.S. viewers (millions)
1	1	"Something Wicca This Way Comes"	John T. Kretchmer	Constance M. Burge	October 7, 1998	1498704	7.72
2	2	"I've Got You Under My Skin"	John T. Kretchmer	Brad Kern	October 14, 1998	4398001	6.91
3	3	"Thank You for Not Morphing"	Ellen Pressman	Chris Levinson & Zack Estrin	October 21, 1998	4398003	7.01
4	4	"Dead Man Dating"	Richard Compton	Javier Grillo-Marxuach	October 28, 1998	4398005	5.94
5	5	"Dream Sorcerer"	Nick Marck	Constance M. Burge	November 4, 1998	4398002	4.91
6	6	"The Wedding from Hell"	Robert Ginty	Greg Elliot & Michael Perricone	November 11, 1998	4398004	7.15
7	7	"The Fourth Sister"	Gilbert Adler	Edithe Swensen	November 18, 1998	4398006	6.39
8	8	"The Truth Is Out There… and It Hurts"	James A. Contner	Zack Estrin & Chris Levinson	November 25, 1998	4398007	5.40
9	9	"The Witch Is Back"	Richard Denault	Sheryl J. Anderson	December 16, 1998	4398008	5.99
10	10	"Wicca Envy"	Mel Damski	Story by : Brad Kern; Teleplay by : Brad Kern & Sheryl J. Anderson	January 13, 1999	4398009	6.35
11	11	"Feats of Clay"	Kevin Inch	Story by : Javier Grillo-Marxuach; Teleplay by : Michael Perricone & Greg Elliot & Chris Levinson & Zack Estrin	January 20, 1999	4398010	5.96
12	12	"The Wendigo"	James L. Conway	Edithe Swensen	February 3, 1999	4398011	5.81
13	13	"From Fear to Eternity"	Les Sheldon	Tony Blake & Paul Jackson	February 10, 1999	4398012	5.66
14	14	"Secrets and Guys"	James A. Contner	Story by : Constance M. Burge & Brad Kern; Teleplay by : Constance M. Burge & Sheryl J. Anderson	February 17, 1999	4398013	5.50
15	15	"Is There a Woogy in the House?"	John T. Kretchmer	Zack Estrin & Chris Levinson	February 24, 1999	4398014	4.98
16	16	"Which Prue Is It, Anyway?"	John Behring	Javier Grillo-Marxuach	March 3, 1999	4398015	4.87
17	17	"That '70s Episode"	Richard Compton	Sheryl J. Anderson	April 7, 1999	4398016	5.68
18	18	"When Bad Warlocks Go Good"	Kevin Inch	Edithe Swensen	April 28, 1999 (Note: The episode "When Bad Warlocks Go Good" was originally scheduled for April 21, 1999, but after the Columbine High School Tragedy the episode was rescheduled for April 28, 1999 to pay respect to those who died.)	4398017	5.10
19	19	"Out of Sight"	Craig Zisk	Tony Blake & Paul Jackson	May 5, 1999	4398018	4.93
20	20	"The Power of Two"	Elodie Keene	Brad Kern	May 12, 1999	4398019	5.56
21	21	"Love Hurts"	James Whitmore Jr.	Chris Levinson & Zack Estrin & Javier Grillo-Marxuach	May 19, 1999	4398020	5.68
22	22	"Déjà Vu All Over Again"	Les Sheldon	Constance M. Burge & Brad Kern	May 26, 1999	4398021	5.69

=== Season 2 (1999–2000) ===
No. overall	No. in season	Title	Directed by	Written by	Original release date	Prod. code	Viewers (millions)
23	1	"Witch Trial"	Craig Zisk	Brad Kern	September 30, 1999	4399022	5.12
24	2	"Morality Bites"	John Behring	Chris Levinson & Zack Estrin	October 7, 1999	4399024	6.08
25	3	"The Painted World"	Kevin Inch	Constance M. Burge	October 14, 1999	4399023	6.39
26	4	"The Devil's Music"	Richard Compton	David Simkins	October 21, 1999	4399025	5.32
27	5	"She's a Man, Baby, a Man!"	Martha Mitchell	Javier Grillo-Marxuach	November 4, 1999	4399026	5.28
28	6	"That Old Black Magic"	James L. Conway	Valerie Mayhew & Vivian Mayhew	November 11, 1999	4399027	5.87
29	7	"They're Everywhere"	Mel Damski	Sheryl J. Anderson	November 18, 1999	4399028	5.64
30	8	"P3 H2O"	John Behring	Chris Levinson & Zack Estrin	December 9, 1999	4399029	5.35
31	9	"Ms. Hellfire"	Craig Zisk	Story by : Constance M. Burge; Teleplay by : Constance M. Burge & Sheryl J. Anderson	January 13, 2000	4399030	4.72
32	10	"Heartbreak City"	Michael Zinberg	David Simkins	January 20, 2000	4399031	5.04
33	11	"Reckless Abandon"	Craig Zisk	Javier Grillo-Marxuach	January 27, 2000	4399032	7.48
34	12	"Awakened"	Anson Williams	Valerie Mayhew & Vivian Mayhew	February 3, 2000	4399033	4.78
35	13	"Animal Pragmatism"	Don Kurt	Chris Levinson & Zack Estrin	February 10, 2000	4399034	5.28
36	14	"Pardon My Past"	John Paré	Michael Gleason	February 17, 2000	4399035	4.96
37	15	"Give Me A Sign"	James A. Contner	Sheryl J. Anderson	February 24, 2000	4399036	5.44
38	16	"Murphy's Luck"	John Behring	David Simkins	March 30, 2000	4399037	4.58
39	17	"How to Make a Quilt Out of Americans"	Kevin Inch	Story by : Javier Grillo-Marxuach; Teleplay by : Javier Grillo-Marxuach & Robert Masello	April 6, 2000	4399038	4.66
40	18	"Chick Flick"	Michael Schultz	Zack Estrin & Chris Levinson	April 20, 2000	4399039	4.06
41	19	"Ex Libris"	Joel J. Feigenbaum	Story by : Peter Chomsky; Teleplay by : Brad Kern	April 27, 2000	4399040	4.34
42	20	"Astral Monkey"	Craig Zisk	Story by : Constance M. Burge; Teleplay by : Constance M. Burge & David Simkins	May 4, 2000	4399041	4.54
43	21	"Apocalypse Not"	Michael Zinberg	Story by : Sanford Golden; Teleplay by : Sheryl J. Anderson	May 11, 2000	4399042	4.38
44	22	"Be Careful What You Witch For"	Shannen Doherty	Story by : Brad Kern; Teleplay by : Chris Levinson & Zack Estrin & Brad Kern	May 18, 2000	4399043	4.54

=== Season 3 (2000–2001) ===
No. overall	No. in season	Title	Directed by	Written by	Original release date	Prod. code	U.S. viewers (millions)
45	1	"The Honeymoon's Over"	James L. Conway	Brad Kern	October 5, 2000	62015-03-045	7.65
46	2	"Magic Hour"	John Behring	Zack Estrin & Chris Levinson	October 12, 2000	62015-03-046	5.10
47	3	"Once Upon a Time"	Joel J. Feigenbaum	Krista Vernoff	October 19, 2000	62015-03-047	5.37
48	4	"All Halliwell's Eve"	Anson Williams	Sheryl J. Anderson	October 26, 2000	62015-03-048	6.53
49	5	"Sight Unseen"	Perry Lang	William Schmidt	November 2, 2000	62015-03-049	5.72
50	6	"Primrose Empath"	Mel Damski	Daniel Cerone	November 9, 2000	62015-03-051	6.09
51	7	"Power Outage"	Craig Zisk	Monica Breen & Alison Schapker	November 16, 2000	62015-03-050	5.67
52	8	"Sleuthing with the Enemy"	Noel Nosseck	Peter Hume	December 14, 2000	62015-03-052	5.53
53	9	"Coyote Piper"	Chris Long	Krista Vernoff	January 11, 2001	62015-03-053	5.12
54	10	"We All Scream for Ice Cream"	Allan Kroeker	Chris Levinson & Zack Estrin	January 18, 2001	62015-03-054	5.44
55	11	"Blinded by the Whitelighter"	David Straiton	Nell Scovell	January 25, 2001	62015-03-055	5.44
56	12	"Wrestling with Demons"	Joel J. Feigenbaum	Sheryl J. Anderson	February 1, 2001	62015-03-056	5.91
57	13	"Bride and Gloom"	Chris Long	William Schmidt	February 8, 2001	62015-03-057	5.37
58	14	"The Good, the Bad and the Cursed"	Shannen Doherty	Monica Breen & Alison Schapker	February 15, 2001	62015-03-058	5.15
59	15	"Just Harried"	Mel Damski	Daniel Cerone	February 22, 2001	62015-03-059	5.79
60	16	"Death Takes a Halliwell"	Jon Paré	Krista Vernoff	March 15, 2001	62015-03-060	5.42
61	17	"Pre-Witched"	David Straiton	Chris Levinson & Zack Estrin	March 22, 2001	62015-03-061	5.09
62	18	"Sin Francisco"	Joel J. Feigenbaum	Nell Scovell	April 19, 2001	62015-03-062	4.03
63	19	"The Demon Who Came in from the Cold"	Anson Williams	Sheryl J. Anderson	April 26, 2001	62015-03-063	3.46
64	20	"Exit Strategy"	Joel J. Feigenbaum	Story by : Peter Hume; Teleplay by : Peter Hume & Daniel Cerone	May 3, 2001	62015-03-064	4.07
65	21	"Look Who's Barking"	John Behring	Story by : Curtis Kheel; Teleplay by : Curtis Kheel & Monica Breen & Alison Schapker	May 10, 2001	62015-03-065	4.68
66	22	"All Hell Breaks Loose"	Shannen Doherty	Brad Kern	May 17, 2001	62015-03-066	5.26

=== Season 4 (2001–2002) ===
No. overall	No. in season	Title	Directed by	Written by	Original release date	Prod. code	U.S. viewers (millions)
67	1	"Charmed Again"	Michael Schultz	Brad Kern	October 4, 2001	62015-04-067	5.97
68	2	"Charmed Again"	Mel Damski	Brad Kern	October 4, 2001	62015-04-068	5.97
69	3	"Hell Hath No Fury"	Chris Long	Krista Vernoff	October 11, 2001	62015-04-069	5.03
70	4	"Enter the Demon"	Joel J. Feigenbaum	Daniel Cerone	October 18, 2001	62015-04-071	5.74
71	5	"Size Matters"	Noel Nosseck	Nell Scovell	October 25, 2001	62015-04-070	5.29
72	6	"A Knight to Remember"	David Straiton	Alison Schapker & Monica Breen	November 1, 2001	62015-04-072	4.69
73	7	"Brain Drain"	John Behring	Curtis Kheel	November 8, 2001	62015-04-073	4.75
74	8	"Black as Cole"	Les Landau	Story by : Abbey Campbell; Teleplay by : Brad Kern & Nell Scovell	November 15, 2001	62015-04-074	5.10
75	9	"Muse to My Ears"	Joel J. Feigenbaum	Krista Vernoff	December 13, 2001	62015-04-075	4.46
76	10	"A Paige from the Past"	James L. Conway	Daniel Cerone	January 17, 2002	62015-04-076	3.42
77	11	"Trial by Magic"	Scott Laughlin	Michael Gleason	January 24, 2002	62015-04-077	4.14
78	12	"Lost and Bound"	Noel Nosseck	Nell Scovell	January 31, 2002	62015-04-078	3.89
79	13	"Charmed and Dangerous"	Jon Paré	Alison Schapker & Monica Breen	February 7, 2002	62015-04-079	4.74
80	14	"The Three Faces of Phoebe"	Joel J. Feigenbaum	Curtis Kheel	February 14, 2002	62015-04-080	4.66
81	15	"Marry-Go-Round"	Chris Long	Daniel Cerone	March 14, 2002	62015-04-081	4.48
82	16	"The Fifth Halliwheel"	David Straiton	Krista Vernoff	March 21, 2002	62015-04-082	4.82
83	17	"Saving Private Leo"	John Behring	Story by : Doug E. Jones; Teleplay by : Daniel Cerone	March 28, 2002	62015-04-083	3.87
84	18	"Bite Me"	John T. Kretchmer	Curtis Kheel	April 18, 2002	62015-04-084	3.60
85	19	"We're Off to See the Wizard"	Timothy J. Lonsdale	Alison Schapker & Monica Breen	April 25, 2002	62015-04-085	4.18
86	20	"Long Live the Queen"	Jon Paré	Krista Vernoff	May 2, 2002	62015-04-086	4.70
87	21	"Womb Raider"	Mel Damski	Daniel Cerone	May 9, 2002	62015-04-087	4.98
88	22	"Witch Way Now?"	Brad Kern	Brad Kern	May 16, 2002	62015-04-088	5.22

=== Season 5 (2002–2003) ===
No. overall	No. in season	Title	Directed by	Written by	Original release date	Prod. code	U.S. viewers (millions)
89	1	"A Witch's Tail"	James L. Conway	Daniel Cerone	September 22, 2002	62015-05-089	6.32
90	2	"A Witch's Tail"	Mel Damski	Monica Breen & Alison Schapker	September 22, 2002	62015-05-090	6.32
91	3	"Happily Ever After"	John T. Kretchmer	Curtis Kheel	September 29, 2002	62015-05-091	5.06
92	4	"Siren Song"	Joel J. Feigenbaum	Krista Vernoff	October 6, 2002	62015-05-092	5.27
93	5	"Witches in Tights"	David Straiton	Mark Wilding	October 13, 2002	62015-05-093	4.95
94	6	"The Eyes Have It"	James Marshall	Laurie Parres	October 20, 2002	62015-05-094	5.21
95	7	"Sympathy for the Demon"	Stuart Gillard	Henry Alonso Myers	November 3, 2002	62015-05-095	4.77
96	8	"A Witch in Time"	John Behring	Daniel Cerone	November 10, 2002	62015-05-096	5.46
97	9	"Sam, I Am"	Joel J. Feigenbaum	Alison Schapker & Monica Breen	November 17, 2002	62015-05-097	5.08
98	10	"Y Tu Mummy También"	Chris Long	Curtis Kheel	January 5, 2003	62015-05-098	5.46
99	11	"The Importance of Being Phoebe"	Derek Johansen	Krista Vernoff	January 12, 2003	62015-05-099	5.40
100	12	"Centennial Charmed"	James L. Conway	Brad Kern	January 19, 2003	62015-05-100	5.49
101	13	"House Call"	Jon Paré	Henry Alonso Myers	February 2, 2003	62015-05-101	5.33
102	14	"Sand Francisco Dreamin'"	John T. Kretchmer	Alison Schapker & Monica Breen	February 9, 2003	62015-05-102	5.14
103	15	"The Day the Magic Died"	Stuart Gillard	Daniel Cerone	February 16, 2003	62015-05-103	5.60
104	16	"Baby's First Demon"	John T. Kretchmer	Krista Vernoff	March 30, 2003	62015-05-104	5.61
105	17	"Lucky Charmed"	Roxann Dawson	Curtis Kheel	April 6, 2003	62015-05-105	4.51
106	18	"Cat House"	James L. Conway	Brad Kern	April 13, 2003	62015-05-106	4.17
107	19	"Nymphs Just Want to Have Fun"	Mel Damski	Andrea Stevens & Doug E. Jones	April 20, 2003	62015-05-107	4.25
108	20	"Sense and Sense Ability"	Stewart Schill & Joel J. Feigenbaum	Story by : Brian Krause & Ed Bokinskie; Teleplay by : Daniel Cerone & Krista Vernoff	April 27, 2003	62015-05-108	4.08
109	21	"Necromancing the Stone"	Jon Paré	Henry Alonso Myers & Alison Schapker & Monica Breen	May 4, 2003	62015-05-109	4.99
110	22	"Oh My Goddess"	Jonathan West	Krista Vernoff & Curtis Kheel	May 11, 2003	62015-05-110	4.90
111	23	"Oh My Goddess"	Joel J. Feigenbaum	Daniel Cerone	May 11, 2003	62015-05-111	4.90

=== Season 6 (2003–2004) ===
No. overall	No. in season	Title	Directed by	Written by	Original release date	Prod. code	U.S. viewers (millions)
112	1	"Valhalley of the Dolls"	James L. Conway	Brad Kern	September 28, 2003	62015-06-112	6.26
113	2	"Valhalley of the Dolls"	James L. Conway	Brad Kern	September 28, 2003	62015-06-113	6.26
114	3	"Forget Me... Not"	John T. Kretchmer	Henry Alonso Myers	October 5, 2003	62015-06-114	5.84
115	4	"The Power of Three Blondes"	John Behring	Daniel Cerone	October 12, 2003	62015-06-115	5.38
116	5	"Love's a Witch"	Stuart Gillard	Jeannine Renshaw	October 19, 2003	62015-06-116	5.35
117	6	"My Three Witches"	Joel J. Feigenbaum	Scott Lipsey & Whip Lipsey	October 26, 2003	62015-06-117	5.49
118	7	"Soul Survivor"	Mel Damski	Curtis Kheel	November 2, 2003	62015-06-118	5.19
119	8	"Sword and the City"	Derek Johansen	David Simkins	November 9, 2003	62015-06-119	5.18
120	9	"Little Monsters"	James L. Conway	Julie Hess	November 16, 2003	62015-06-120	5.30
121	10	"Chris-Crossed"	Joel J. Feigenbaum	Cameron Litvack	November 23, 2003	62015-06-121	6.03
122	11	"Witchstock"	James A. Contner	Daniel Cerone	January 11, 2004	62015-06-122	5.29
123	12	"Prince Charmed"	David Jackson	Henry Alonso Myers	January 18, 2004	62015-06-123	3.89
124	13	"Used Karma"	John T. Kretchmer	Jeannine Renshaw	January 25, 2004	62015-06-124	4.23
125	14	"The Legend of Sleepy Halliwell"	Jon Paré	Cameron Litvack	February 8, 2004	62015-06-125	4.79
126	15	"I Dream of Phoebe"	John T. Kretchmer	Curtis Kheel	February 15, 2004	62015-06-126	4.08
127	16	"The Courtship of Wyatt's Father"	Joel J. Feigenbaum	Brad Kern	February 22, 2004	62015-06-127	5.01
128	17	"Hyde School Reunion"	Jonathan West	David Simkins	March 14, 2004	62015-06-128	4.82
129	18	"Spin City"	Mel Damski	Andy Reaser & Doug E. Jones	April 18, 2004	62015-06-129	3.86
130	19	"Crimes and Witch-Demeanors"	John T. Kretchmer	Henry Alonso Myers	April 25, 2004	62015-06-130	3.40
131	20	"A Wrong Day's Journey Into Right"	Derek Johansen	Cameron Litvack	May 2, 2004	62015-06-131	4.10
132	21	"Witch Wars"	David Jackson	Krista Vernoff	May 9, 2004	62015-06-132	2.77
133	22	"It's a Bad, Bad, Bad, Bad World"	Jon Paré	Jeannine Renshaw	May 16, 2004	62015-06-133	4.75
134	23	"It's a Bad, Bad, Bad, Bad World"	Jon Paré	Curtis Kheel	May 16, 2004	62015-06-134	4.75

=== Season 7 (2004–2005) ===
No. overall	No. in season	Title	Directed by	Written by	Original release date	Prod. code	U.S. viewers (millions)
135	1	"A Call to Arms"	James L. Conway	Brad Kern	September 12, 2004	62015-07-135	5.59
136	2	"The Bare Witch Project"	John T. Kretchmer	Jeannine Renshaw	September 19, 2004	62015-07-136	4.84
137	3	"Cheaper by the Coven"	Derek Johansen	Mark Wilding	September 26, 2004	62015-07-137	5.37
138	4	"Charrrmed!"	Mel Damski	Cameron Litvack	October 3, 2004	62015-07-138	4.77
139	5	"Styx Feet Under"	Christopher Leitch	Henry Alonso Myers	October 10, 2004	62015-07-139	4.81
140	6	"Once in a Blue Moon"	John T. Kretchmer	Debra J. Fisher & Erica Messer	October 17, 2004	62015-07-140	4.63
141	7	"Someone to Witch Over Me"	Jon Paré	Rob Wright	October 31, 2004	62015-07-141	3.96
142	8	"Charmed Noir"	Michael Grossman	Curtis Kheel	November 14, 2004	62015-07-142	3.94
143	9	"There's Something About Leo"	Derek Johansen	Natalie Antoci & Scott Lipsey	November 21, 2004	62015-07-143	3.95
144	10	"Witchness Protection"	David Jackson	Jeannine Renshaw	November 28, 2004	62015-07-144	4.17
145	11	"Ordinary Witches"	Jonathan West	Mark Wilding	January 16, 2005	62015-07-145	3.52
146	12	"Extreme Makeover: World Edition"	LeVar Burton	Cameron Litvack	January 23, 2005	62015-07-146	3.56
147	13	"Charmageddon"	John T. Kretchmer	Henry Alonso Myers	January 30, 2005	62015-07-147	3.97
148	14	"Carpe Demon"	Stuart Gillard	Curtis Kheel	February 13, 2005	62015-07-148	2.95
149	15	"Show Ghouls"	Mel Damski	Rob Wright & Debra J. Fisher & Erica Messer	February 20, 2005	62015-07-149	3.23
150	16	"The Seven Year Witch"	Michael Grossman	Jeannine Renshaw	April 10, 2005	62015-07-150	3.97
151	17	"Scry Hard"	Derek Johansen	Andy Reaser & Doug E. Jones	April 17, 2005	62015-07-151	3.48
152	18	"Little Box of Horrors"	Jon Paré	Cameron Litvack	April 24, 2005	62015-07-152	3.92
153	19	"Freaky Phoebe"	Michael Grossman	Mark Wilding	May 1, 2005	62015-07-153	3.65
154	20	"Imaginary Fiends"	Jonathan West	Henry Alonso Myers	May 8, 2005	62015-07-154	3.32
155	21	"Death Becomes Them"	John T. Kretchmer	Curtis Kheel	May 15, 2005	62015-07-155	3.44
156	22	"Something Wicca This Way Goes...?"	James L. Conway	Story by : Rob Wright & Brad Kern; Teleplay by : Brad Kern	May 22, 2005	62015-07-156	3.44

=== Season 8 (2005–2006) ===
No. overall	No. in season	Title	Directed by	Written by	Original release date	Prod. code	U.S. viewers (millions)
157	1	"Still Charmed & Kicking"	James L. Conway	Brad Kern	September 25, 2005	62015-08-157	4.27
158	2	"Malice in Wonderland"	Mel Damski	Brad Kern	October 2, 2005	62015-08-158	3.83
159	3	"Run, Piper, Run"	Derek Johansen	Cameron Litvack	October 9, 2005	62015-08-159	4.12
160	4	"Desperate Housewitches"	Jon Paré	Jeannine Renshaw	October 16, 2005	62015-08-160	4.21
161	5	"Rewitched"	John T. Kretchmer	Rob Wright	October 23, 2005	62015-08-161	4.26
162	6	"Kill Billie Vol. 1"	Michael Grossman	Elizabeth Hunter	October 30, 2005	62015-08-162	4.32
163	7	"The Lost Picture Show"	Jonathan West	Doug E. Jones & Andy Reaser	November 6, 2005	62015-08-163	3.87
164	8	"Battle of the Hexes"	LeVar Burton	Jeannine Renshaw	November 13, 2005	62015-08-164	4.38
165	9	"Hulkus Pocus"	Joel F. Feigenbaum	Liz Sagal	November 20, 2005	62015-08-165	4.22
166	10	"Vaya Con Leos"	Janice Cooke Leonard	Cameron Litvack	November 27, 2005	62015-08-166	4.34
167	11	"Mr. & Mrs. Witch"	James L. Conway	Rob Wright	January 8, 2006	62015-08-167	3.31
168	12	"Payback's a Witch"	Mel Damski	Brad Kern	January 15, 2006	62015-08-168	3.47
169	13	"Repo Manor"	Derek Johansen	Doug E. Jones	January 22, 2006	62015-08-169	3.67
170	14	"12 Angry Zen"	Jon Paré	Cameron Litvack	February 12, 2006	62015-08-170	3.28
171	15	"The Last Temptation of Christy"	John Kretchmer	Story by : Rick Muirragui; Teleplay by : Liz Sagal	February 19, 2006	62015-08-171	3.89
172	16	"Engaged and Confused"	Stuart Gillard	Jeannine Renshaw	February 26, 2006	62015-08-172	4.07
173	17	"Generation Hex"	Michael Grossman	Rob Wright	April 16, 2006	62015-08-173	2.98
174	18	"The Torn Identity"	LeVar Burton	Andy Reaser	April 23, 2006	62015-08-174	3.39
175	19	"The Jung and the Restless"	Derek Johansen	Cameron Litvack	April 30, 2006	62015-08-175	3.17
176	20	"Gone with the Witches"	Jonathan West	Jeannine Renshaw	May 7, 2006	62015-08-176	3.39
177	21	"Kill Billie Vol. 2"	Jon Paré	Brad Kern	May 14, 2006	62015-08-177	3.72
178	22	"Forever Charmed"	James L. Conway	Brad Kern	May 21, 2006	62015-08-178	4.49

=== Specials ===
No.	Title	Date	Format
1	The Women of Charmed	April 19, 2000	TV
2	Charmed: Behind the Magic	February 1, 2003 (UK)	TV

== Ratings ==
Charmed : U.S. viewers per episode (millions)

Season	Episode number																							Average
Season	1	2	3	4	5	6	7	8	9	10	11	12	13	14	15	16	17	18	19	20	21	22	23	Average
1	7.72	6.91	7.01	5.94	4.91	7.15	6.39	5.40	5.99	6.35	5.96	5.81	5.66	5.50	4.98	4.87	5.68	5.10	4.93	5.56	5.68	5.69	–	5.87
2	5.12	6.08	6.39	5.32	5.28	5.87	5.64	5.35	4.72	5.04	7.48	4.78	5.28	4.96	5.44	4.58	4.66	4.06	4.34	4.54	4.38	4.54	–	5.18
3	7.65	5.10	5.37	6.53	5.72	6.09	5.67	5.53	5.12	5.44	5.44	5.91	5.37	5.15	5.79	5.42	5.09	4.03	3.46	4.07	4.68	5.26	–	5.35
4	5.97	5.97	5.03	5.74	5.29	4.69	4.75	5.10	4.46	3.42	4.14	3.89	4.74	4.66	4.48	4.82	3.87	3.60	4.18	4.70	4.98	5.22	–	4.70
5	6.32	6.32	5.06	5.27	4.95	5.21	4.77	5.46	5.08	5.46	5.40	5.49	5.33	5.14	5.60	5.61	4.51	4.17	4.25	4.08	4.99	4.90	4.90	5.10
6	6.26	6.26	5.84	5.38	5.35	5.49	5.19	5.18	5.30	6.03	5.29	3.89	4.23	4.79	4.08	5.01	4.82	3.86	3.40	4.10	2.77	4.75	4.75	4.85
7	5.59	4.84	5.37	4.77	4.81	4.63	3.96	3.94	3.95	4.17	3.52	3.56	3.97	2.95	3.23	3.97	3.48	3.92	3.65	3.32	3.44	3.44	–	4.02
8	4.27	3.83	4.12	4.21	4.26	4.32	3.87	4.38	4.22	4.34	3.31	3.47	3.67	3.28	3.89	4.07	2.98	3.39	3.17	3.39	3.72	4.49	–	3.84

Audience measurement performed by Nielsen Media Research
