= Charmed season 1 =

Season of television series

Charmed
- Season 1
- DVD cover
- Starring: Shannen Doherty; Holly Marie Combs; Alyssa Milano; T. W. King; Dorian Gregory
- No. of episodes: 22

Release
- Original network: The WB
- Original release: October 7, 1998 – May 26, 1999

Season chronology
- Next → Season 2

The first season of Charmed, an American supernatural drama television series created by Constance M. Burge, originally aired in the United States on The WB from October 7, 1998, through May 26, 1999. Paramount Home Entertainment released the complete first season in a six-disc DVD box set on February 1, 2005, and was released as a high-definition blu-ray on October 30, 2018.

== Synopsis ==
The Halliwell sisters discover that they are descendants of a long line of witches when they inherit a house from their grandmother and find the family's Book of Shadows. They learn that they each have a unique power. The strong-willed Prudence "Prue" Halliwell (Shannen Doherty) can mentally move objects with her mind via her eyes and hands, reserved Piper Halliwell (Holly Marie Combs) is able to temporarily freeze time, and the uninhibited Phoebe Halliwell (Alyssa Milano) has the mental power of premonition. Together they have the "Power of Three", which they must use to fight demons and warlocks, and protect the innocent.

== Cast and characters ==
=== Main ===
- Shannen Doherty as Prue Halliwell
- Holly Marie Combs as Piper Halliwell
- Alyssa Milano as Phoebe Halliwell (Note: Milano was originally credited last but starting with the sixth episode, she is credited between Combs and King.)
- T. W. King as Andy Trudeau
- Dorian Gregory as Darryl Morris (Note: Only credited for the episodes he appears in.)

=== Special guest ===
- Brenda Bakke as Charon

=== Recurring ===
- Neil Roberts as Rex Buckland
- Leigh-Allyn Baker as Hannah Webster
- Brian Krause as Leo Wyatt
- Cristine Rose as Claire Pryce
- Shawn Christian as Josh
- Carlos Gómez as Inspector Rodriguez

=== Guest ===
- Matthew Ashford as Roger
- Tony Denison as Victor Bennett
- John Cho as Mark Chao
- Matt Schulze as Whitaker Berman
- Danielle Harris as Aviva
- Rebecca Balding as Jackie
- Billy Drago as Barbas, the Demon of Fear
- Jennifer Rhodes as Penny Halliwell
- Tyler Layton as Melinda Warren
- Bernie Kopell as Coroner
- Finola Hughes as Patty Halliwell
- Michael Weatherly as Brendan Rowe
- Raphael Sbarge as Brent Miller
- Jeff Kober as Jackson Ward
- Michael Trucco as Alec
- Lisa Robin Kelly as Daisy
- David Carradine as Tempus
- Scott Plank as Eric Lohman

== Episodes ==
No. overall	No. in season	Title	Directed by	Written by	Original release date	Prod. code	U.S. viewers (millions)
1	1	"Something Wicca This Way Comes"	John T. Kretchmer	Constance M. Burge	October 7, 1998	1498704	7.72
The Halliwell sisters are reunited in the grand Victorian home of their childhood. Phoebe discovers the Book of Shadows in the attic and when she reads the spell on the first page, their inherent magical abilities are activated. The sisters must try to keep their newly developed powers secret, while Prue's ex-boyfriend, Inspector Andy Trudeau, is investigating a serial killer whose victims are all witches. Piper narrowly escapes death when she discovers that her boyfriend Jeremy, an evil warlock, is the killer. When the sisters try their first spell, Jeremy is vanquished, and they discover the ancient Power of Three.
2	2	"I've Got You Under My Skin"	John T. Kretchmer	Brad Kern	October 14, 1998	4398001	6.91
Phoebe meets a photographer who turns out to be a demon who sucks the youth out of young women in order to remain young. While Phoebe is with him, Piper sees her friend Brittany Reynolds, who is now elderly and has a poor memory after being attacked by the photographer. Brittany recognizes the address of the photographer, allowing Prue and Piper to arrive in time to vanquish the demon named Javna and reverse the damage it had done.
3	3	"Thank You for Not Morphing"	Ellen Pressman	Chris Levinson & Zack Estrin	October 21, 1998	4398003	7.01
The sisters' estranged father Victor returns, and is immediately at odds with Prue who cannot forgive him for being an absentee father. He confesses he is trying to save the girls from the risks of having their powers by removing the Book of Shadows from the manor. However, it appears he has teamed up with the new neighbors, who are shapeshifters trying to steal the book. The sisters vanquish the shape-shifters and their father accepts their destiny. Despite planning to meet up with them, he leaves town, but leaves a videotape of a happy Christmas the family had.
4	4	"Dead Man Dating"	Richard Compton	Javier Grillo-Marxuach	October 28, 1998	4398005	5.94
Piper encounters and eventually develops romantic feelings for the amiable ghost of a recently murdered man named Mark Chao (John Cho), who needs her help to be properly buried before an ancient Chinese spirit, Yama, can harvest his soul, and to settle the score with the Chinese gangster who had killed Mark in order to fake his own death to evade the police. Phoebe takes a job as a hotel psychic to pay for Prue's birthday present, and when foreseeing the death of a hotel guest, she has to try to keep him from being hit by a car. In the end, Piper exposes the criminal who is killed by Andy in self-defense. The being Yama appears and Mark throws the criminal's soul to him, sending him to Hell. Piper is able to convince Yama to leave Mark alone and after his burial, he moves on after saying a tearful goodbye. The encounter with Mark causes Prue to change her mind about celebrating her birthday and her sisters throw her a surprise party back at the Manor.
5	5	"Dream Sorcerer"	Nick Marck	Constance M. Burge	November 4, 1998	4398002	4.91
Prue finds her sleep disturbed by strange dreams in which she is stalked and taunted by a man who is actually a sleep researcher named Whitaker Berman (Matt Schulze). He kills women who he feels scorned him by visiting them in their dreams where he has absolute power. While Prue is fatigued and driving home from work in her car he attacks again and successfully causes her to drive into a telephone pole. As Prue is unconscious, he unsuccessfully tries to kill her. With encouragement from her sisters, she uses her telekinesis in the dream world to throw him off a building, killing him.
6	6	"The Wedding from Hell"	Robert Ginty	Greg Elliot & Michael Perricone	November 11, 1998	4398004	7.15
A demonic bride-to-be, Jade D'Mon, suddenly replaces a human bride, Alison Michaels, a week before her wedding, by having a magical contractual 'hold' over the grooms' mother, Grace Spencer, as well as by casting a spell over the groom, Elliot Spencer. The Halliwell sisters gradually discover the strange events about the wedding, as Piper is catering the event. Alison and the sisters formulate a plan to stop the demonic wedding. Grace helps Alison and the Halliwell sisters, resulting in the defeat of Jade and the reconciliation of Alison and Elliot.
7	7	"The Fourth Sister"	Gilbert Adler	Edithe Swensen	November 18, 1998	4398006	6.39
A troubled teenage witch, Aviva (Danielle Harris), befriends Phoebe with the hopes of joining the sisters, but is an unwitting pawn of a demonic sorceress/priestess named Kali. The sisters investigate and identify the sorceress who possesses Aviva when she refuses to help anymore. Piper and Prue manage to trap Kali in a mirror and Phoebe shatters it, vanquishing her. Aviva drops her bad lifestyle and leaves to reunite with her aunt.
8	8	"The Truth Is Out There… and It Hurts"	James A. Contner	Zack Estrin & Chris Levinson	November 25, 1998	4398007	5.40
Acting on Phoebe's premonition of a woman electrocuted magically through the center of her forehead, the sisters race to stop a mysterious warlock, who came from the future for killing those responsible for creating a vaccine against warlocks. Prue casts a truth spell to find out how Andy will react to her secret. Prue sadly finds out that Andy cannot handle the knowledge of her powers and the magical parallel reality she has to deal with. She breaks up with him while Prue and Piper vanquish the warlock before he can kill a pregnant woman whose baby he is truly after.
9	9	"The Witch Is Back"	Richard Denault	Sheryl J. Anderson	December 16, 1998	4398008	5.99
Matthew Tate, a warlock cursed by the sisters' ancestor, Melinda Warren, in the 17th century in colonial New England, is inadvertently released by Prue from a cursed locket which will open only to a Warren descendant. Aware of the situation, the sisters resurrect Melinda to combat him. Together they trap him back in the locket, but their secret is revealed to Prue's boss, Rex, and coworker, Hannah, who are warlocks.
10	10	"Wicca Envy"	Mel Damski	Story by : Brad Kern; Teleplay by : Brad Kern & Sheryl J. Anderson	January 13, 1999	4398009	6.35
Rex uses astral projection to control Prue's mind, tricking her into stealing a tiara from a vault in the auction house. Prue ends up in jail. Rex blackmails the sisters into giving up their powers to him, but Leo, revealing himself as some kind of supernatural protector of the sisters, returns their powers to them. Now fully empowered, Prue, Piper and Phoebe defeat Rex and Hannah who are vanquished by evil forces for their failure.
11	11	"Feats of Clay"	Kevin Inch	Story by : Javier Grillo-Marxuach; Teleplay by : Michael Perricone & Greg Elliot & Chris Levinson & Zack Estrin	January 20, 1999	4398010	5.96
Phoebe's ex-boyfriend from New York, Clay, comes to town with a mysterious Egyptian urn and asks if Prue could sell it for him on the auction block. Phoebe convinces Prue to try to sell Clay's urn, but Prue soon finds out that the urn is not only stolen but protected by a guardian who punishes those who stole it with death. When Clay selflessly risks his own life to save Phoebe, the guardian spares him and returns the urn to where it belongs.
12	12	"The Wendigo"	James L. Conway	Edithe Swensen	February 3, 1999	4398011	5.81
When Piper's car breaks down, she is attacked by a vicious werewolf-like beast that they later find out is called a Wendigo. Piper is saved by a man named Billy, but she starts to turn into a Wendigo since she was scratched by the one that attacked her. The Wendigo turns out to be FBI agent Ashley Fallon, who had apparently been tracking the beast. Fallon kills Billy and tries to kill Andy, but Prue and Phoebe go after her with a flare gun as fire is the Wendigo's weakness. Piper shows up as well and they nearly accidentally vanquish her instead, but she freezes the flare and Prue sends it into Fallon, killing her and curing Piper.
13	13	"From Fear to Eternity"	Les Sheldon	Tony Blake & Paul Jackson	February 10, 1999	4398012	5.66
Barbas, the Demon of Fear, spends Friday the 13th literally scaring witches to death. He tries to drown Prue in the shower, as her greatest fear is drowning. Barbas realizes that Phoebe's greatest fear is losing a sister, so he tries to drown Prue again with Phoebe watching. This time, Prue feels the presence of her late mother and manages to release her fear and vanquish Barbas.
14	14	"Secrets and Guys"	James A. Contner	Story by : Constance M. Burge & Brad Kern; Teleplay by : Constance M. Burge & Sheryl J. Anderson	February 17, 1999	4398013	5.50
Prue gets a magical distress call from a young witch named Max who is forced into helping two thieves rob a bank and is captured and forced to take part in the robbery too. Max's father tries to intervene and is shot, and Prue and Max are forced to leave him behind. At the same time, Leo returns and while fixing a chandelier, Phoebe discovers him levitating and learns that he is a Whitelighter, guardian angels of good witches who is protecting Max by directing Prue to him. He truly loves Piper, but it is forbidden and he needs to figure out how to break up with her. Prue gets Max to short out the bomb that the thieves are using to force their co-operation and trap them in the vault. As Max's father lies dying, Leo arrives and heals his wound and convinces him to get over his wife's death and be a father to his son. Helping Max restores Prue's faith in having children.
15	15	"Is There a Woogy in the House?"	John T. Kretchmer	Zack Estrin & Chris Levinson	February 24, 1999	4398014	4.98
Phoebe is corrupted and turned against her sisters by the "Woogyman", an extremely powerful entity that is released following an earthquake. Under the orders of the Woogy, she corrupts others as well, including one of Claire's associates from the Auction House when they visit for a work mixers. Before Piper and Prue can be enslaved, Phoebe recites the vanquishing spell after having a past vision of Grams defeating the Woogy from a picture frame when she was younger.
16	16	"Which Prue Is It, Anyway?"	John Behring	Javier Grillo-Marxuach	March 3, 1999	4398015	4.87
When Phoebe has a vividly disturbing vision of Prue being stabbed to death, it coincides with a lord of war named Gabriel coming to town in order to kill the eldest witch-sister as he had done to the sisters' great-great-great-aunt. Prue casts a spell to further develop and strengthen her powers, but ends up making two clones of herself. Her clones are killed off, but working with her sisters, she manages to vanquish Gabriel.
17	17	"That '70s Episode"	Richard Compton	Sheryl J. Anderson	April 7, 1999	4398016	5.68
A powerful warlock, Nicholas, shows up claiming that he made a pact with the sisters' mother in which he spared her life in exchange for the girls' powers. Fleeing him, the three sisters go back in time to the 1970s before Phoebe was born, when their mother was still alive and they try to prevent the pact. They manage to get Patty to break the pact and return to the future where he is no longer immune to their respective abilities and vanquish him with a very strong spell left for such a purpose by their late grandmother.
18	18	"When Bad Warlocks Go Good"	Kevin Inch	Edithe Swensen	April 28, 1999 (Note: The episode "When Bad Warlocks Go Good" was originally scheduled for April 21, 1999, but after the Columbine High School Tragedy the episode was rescheduled for April 28, 1999 to pay respect to those who died.)	4398017	5.10
Led by Prue, the Charmed Ones help a young man named Brendan (Michael Weatherly) who wants to become a priest in order to avoid fulfilling his predicted destiny as a warlock along with his brothers. They begin attacking people who are close to Brendan in order to coerce him to give into his darker side. Eventually, his brothers kill each other and he becomes ordained as a priest and cleared of the attacks on innocents and an esteemed priest.
19	19	"Out of Sight"	Craig Zisk	Tony Blake & Paul Jackson	May 5, 1999	4398018	4.93
When Prue tries to stop a kidnapping in the park during a birthday party, a reporter sees her using her strong telekinetic abilities to psionically separate David from the demon. Phoebe and Piper attempt to learn more about the demons who stole the child, who turn out to be Grimlocks, demons which sense people's auras and steal children's eyesight. At the same time, they must try to stop the reporter from exposing Prue and themselves. The reporter gets himself killed so the sisters are not exposed, but Andy does find out about their powers. The sisters vanquish the demons and a former victim of theirs who survived convinces the children they rescued not to tell the truth.: This episode is alternately titled "Blindsided" as reference to the children whose vision is stolen.
20	20	"The Power of Two"	Elodie Keene	Brad Kern	May 12, 1999	4398019	5.56
The evil spirit of a serial killer, Jackson Ward (Jeff Kober) escapes from Alcatraz Island seeking revenge on his judge and jury. Phoebe and Prue must figure out how to vanquish this evil spirit and stop him from killing again without Piper, who is in Hawaii. Eventually, Prue drinks a concoction that temporarily stops her heart and vanquishes the spirit with a spell that can only be cast on the astral plane by a ghost before Andy revives her.
21	21	"Love Hurts"	James Whitmore Jr.	Chris Levinson & Zack Estrin & Javier Grillo-Marxuach	May 19, 1999	4398020	5.68
A gravely hurt Leo appears at the manor, asking the Halliwell sisters to protect an innocent woman returning to San Francisco under his guidance. Daisy (Lisa Robin Kelly) is being stalked by a Darklighter who hunts and kills present and future Whitelighters with poisoned arrows. The Darklighter Alec (Michael Trucco) fell in love with her. Leo reveals that the Darklighter's poison is very deadly, and Piper finds an ability-switching spell in the Book of Shadows so she can use Leo's innate healing power on him. Unfortunately, this has the side-effect of switching everyone's respective abilities and they all have to try to learn to properly use them. While Prue and Phoebe manage to control each other's powers, Piper is unable to heal Leo and he dies. Afterwards, she admits her love for him and discovers that it is the trigger for his mystical ability and succeeds in healing him fully. She then tracks down Daisy, and Prue vanquishes Alec by utilizing his own magical ability against him.
22	22	"Déjà Vu All Over Again"	Les Sheldon	Constance M. Burge & Brad Kern	May 26, 1999	4398021	5.69
Phoebe experiences a powerful and deadly premonition of death at Halliwell manor, which shows Inspector Rodriguez unmasked in a demonic attack on the sisters, that results in Andy being killed. Vowing to prevent Andy's death, Prue heads to the police department to warn Andy that Rodriguez is a demon working undercover. As Rodriguez makes plans for his attempt to kill the Charmed Ones, he receives a visit from Tempus (David Carradine), a demon who can turn back time and who was sent by The Source to help in case he fails. Tempus rewinds time each time Rodriguez fails to kill the Charmed Ones until the warlock succeeds in killing all the sisters. Andy waits in his car after being told by Prue to stay away because it was dangerous. He sees Rodriguez entering the house and goes in to protect Prue. Andy bursts in before Rodriguez can harm the sisters and attempts to shoot him, but Rodriguez fires an energy ball at Andy and kills him. Piper freezes Rodriguez and she and Phoebe are shocked to find Andy dead. Prue receives a vision from Andy's spirit, which helps her to move on. Prue casts the accelerate time and vanquishing Tempus. The sisters vanquish Rodriguez and attend Andy's funeral.

== Reception ==
Charmed received mixed reviews for its first episode. The Hollywood Reporter's Barry Garron wrote that this show is "Funny, Spooky, and Wonderfully Entertaining". David Bianculi of the New York Daily News wrote that it had room to grow, "As Buster Poindexter once sang, they're hot, hot, hot...If Charmed gets more savvy, scary and sexy as weeks go on, and it's a good bet it will, falling under its spell will be an easy thing to do." Howard Rosenberg of the Los Angeles Times disagreed with Bianculi and Garron, "There's no magic, black or otherwise, in The WB's Charmed, a limp drama about three sisters who discover they are witches."
