= All Hell Breaks Loose (Charmed) =

- Charmed episode
- The season ends with Prue (left) and Piper (right) being left for dead by the demon Shax. The cliffhanger ending was conceived by Brad Kern to accommodate potential cast changes. Prue's death has often been cited as one of the most important events in the show.
- Episode no.: Season 3 Episode 22
- Directed by: Shannen Doherty
- Written by: Brad Kern
- Production code: 62015-03-066
- Original air date: May 17, 2001

Guest appearances
- Matt Malloy as Dr. Griffiths; Mercedes Colón as Elana Dominguez

Episode chronology
← Previous "Look Who's Barking"	Next → "Charmed Again"
- Charmed season 3

"All Hell Breaks Loose" is the twenty-second and finale episode of the third season of the American fantasy drama television series Charmed. Written by Brad Kern, the series' showrunner, and directed by Shannen Doherty, one of its leading actresses, "All Hell Breaks Loose" was originally broadcast on The WB on May 17, 2001.

Charmed focuses on the three Halliwell sisters, Prue (Doherty), Piper (Holly Marie Combs) and Phoebe (Alyssa Milano), who are known as the Charmed Ones, the most powerful good witches of all time. They use their powers to protect innocent lives from evil beings such as demons in San Francisco, while trying to lead normal lives. "All Hell Breaks Loose" focuses on their secret as witches getting exposed to the public after Prue and Piper are caught on tape battling the demon Shax (Michael Bailey Smith), which proves to have deadly consequences.

Doherty's role as director was announced in March 2001, with filming taking place in April; "All Hell Breaks Loose" was the third episode of Charmed that she directed. During filming, Doherty used a painting by Salvador Dalí as inspiration for the episode's aesthetic and color scheme and helped her co-stars during emotionally charged scenes. Shortly before the episode aired, Doherty was fired from the series. According to contemporary press releases, she left the series of her own volition due to creative differences. However, rumors circulated that her departure was facilitated by an ongoing conflict with Milano. In 2023, Doherty and Combs stated that her exit from Charmed was indeed due to a feud with Milano. Kern intentionally wrote the episode to end on a cliffhanger with all three sisters' lives being in jeopardy to accommodate any potential cast changes. After Doherty's departure, Tiffani Thiessen and Jennifer Love Hewitt were offered the role of Prue; both turned it down, at which point it was decided to kill the character off.

"All Hell Breaks Loose" was watched by 5.26 million viewers and received positive reviews, often being cited as one of Charmed's best episodes. Critics often highlighted Prue's death, which was recognized as a bold move for the series. The episode's focus on magic's exposure and the consequences this has for the Charmed Ones was also praised, with "All Hell Breaks Loose" being recognized for its thematic connection to prior works involving similar stories. Some of the show's cast members responded negatively to the episode owing to the circumstance regarding Doherty's firing and the handling of Prue's death — particularly Combs — although her directing skills were praised. Doherty considered "All Hell Breaks Loose" her favorite episode out of the ones she directed.

== Background ==
Charmed is an American supernatural drama television series created by Constance M. Burge that aired for eight seasons on The WB network from 1998 to 2006. The series focuses on Prue (Shannen Doherty), Piper (Holly Marie Combs), and Phoebe Halliwell (Alyssa Milano), three sisters who discover they are the Charmed Ones, the most powerful witches to ever exist. Throughout the course of the series, the Halliwell sisters seek to balance their lives in San Francisco while also vanquishing evil beings like demons. Initially, each sister has one unique active power; Prue has telekinesis, Piper can slow down molecules and cause objects or people to "freeze" in place, and Phoebe receives premonitions. As the show progresses, Prue gains the power of astral projection, Piper can speed up molecules and cause objects or beings to explode, while Phoebe becomes capable of levitation.

In their fight against evil beings, the Charmed Ones are aided by Leo Wyatt (Brian Krause), who is their Whitelighter—a guardian angel with the power to "orb" (a form of teleportation) and heal their injuries—and eventually starts a relationship with Piper. In season three, Piper and Leo face challenges in their relationship due to interference from the Elders, who are in charge of Whitelighters, until they are finally allowed to get married. The third season also sees the introduction of Cole Turner (Julian McMahon), a human-demon hybrid who is initially sent to kill the Charmed Ones but falls in love with Phoebe and begins a romance with her.

== Plot ==
The Charmed Ones arrive at their manor with Dr. Griffiths (Matt Malloy), who is being hunted by the demon Shax (Michael Bailey Smith); he attacks them, wounding Prue and Piper. Phoebe performs a vanquishing spell that repels Shax and calls for Leo. He orbs in and heals Prue and Piper, who then search the streets for Shax. He attacks them again, only for Piper to blow him up, unaware a news crew has filmed them. Once Prue and Piper return to the manor, Phoebe informs them she will go to the Underworld to find Cole.

At the news station, Elana Dominguez (Mercedes Colón) shows the footage of Shax's vanquishing, convincing them to air it. Darryl Morris (Dorian Gregory), a police officer friend of the Halliwells, sees the news and informs Prue and Piper their secret is exposed. In the Underworld, Phoebe manages to find Cole. Worried about Shax, Prue and Piper reach the hospital to take Dr. Griffiths back to the manor. Shax appears, forcing them to kill him, where they realize Elana filmed them again.

The manor is swarmed by police officers, news reporters, and protesters. Leo informs Prue and Piper they need the demon Tempus to reverse time. He goes to the Underworld, informing Phoebe and Cole about magic's exposure, and asks for his assistance in getting Tempus to reverse time. Cole asks the Source of All Evil (Michael Bailey Smith) for help, as the existence of demons has also been exposed. The Source agrees to help, but only if Phoebe joins the dark side, prophetically stating it will be the only way to save one of her sisters.

At the manor, Piper is shot by a Wiccan fanatic. With Leo unable to hear them in the Underworld, Prue rushes Piper to the hospital, where she dies. A SWAT team arrives, and Prue uses her powers against them. Leo arrives to learn Piper has died and immediately orbs back to the Underworld. Phoebe agrees to stay in the Underworld to save Piper's life. Cole informs the Source, who secretly orders that Phoebe be killed and Cole be detained. As the SWAT team shoots at Prue, time is reversed to the sisters' first encounter with Shax. With Phoebe in the Underworld, Shax attacks Prue, Piper, and Dr. Griffiths, leaving them for dead.

== Production ==
=== Writing and filming ===
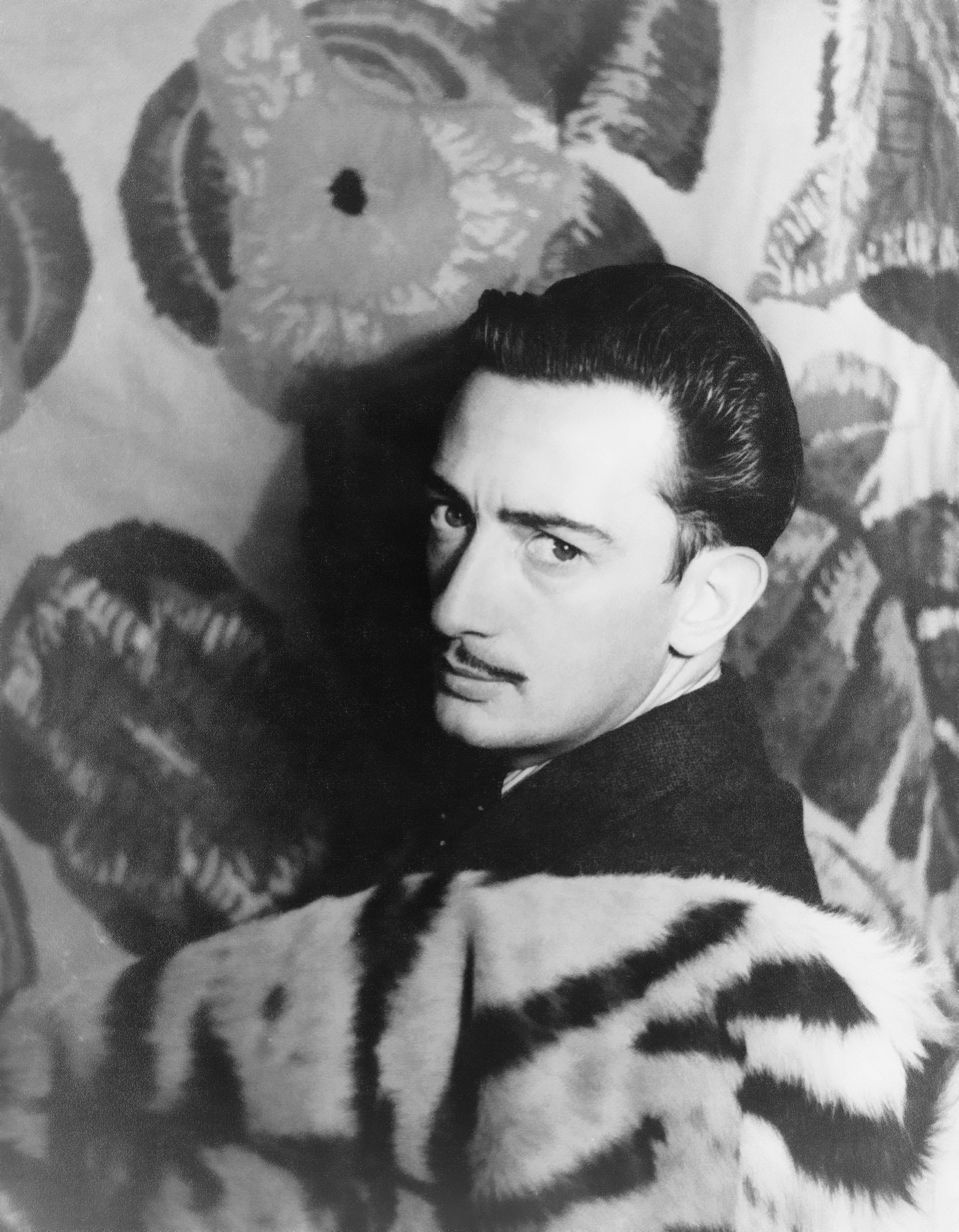
A painting by Salvador Dalí (pictured in 1939) influenced the episode's aesthetic, color scheme, and mood.

"All Hell Breaks Loose" was written by Brad Kern, showrunner of Charmed, and directed by Shannen Doherty. The episode features Matt Malloy as Dr. Griffiths, an innocent that the Charmed Ones have to protect from Shax, and Mercedes Colón as Elana Dominguez, a reporter who manages to capture footage of Prue and Piper battling Shax on live television. Concerning the episode's plot, Kern stated that while having the sisters' secret as witches being exposed would seem like a "high-concept [...] idea", he viewed it as "central to the DNA of [Charmed]", noting that the Halliwells have always had this secret that they tried to maintain.

Doherty's role as director was first announced in March 2001, with filming taking place during April. "All Hell Breaks Loose" marked the third and final episode of Charmed that Doherty directed, following "Be Careful What You Witch For" (2000) and "The Good, The Bad, and The Cursed" (2001). In 2023, Doherty stated on her podcast, Let's Be Clear with Shannen Doherty, that one of the reasons she enjoyed working on Charmed was due to getting the chance to direct, which she described as being "in [her] element". Concerning her directorial style, Doherty stated that she based the aesthetic of her episodes on specific paintings; with "All Hell Breaks Loose", she used a painting by Salvador Dalí as inspiration for its aesthetic, color scheme, and mood. Having some creative control over the characters' appearance in the episodes she directed, Doherty wished for the characters in "All Hell Breaks Loose" to remain within a particular color scheme based on Dalí's painting; his work also influenced the appearance of the Source of All Evil, who makes his debut in this episode.

According to Combs, when it came to filming Piper's death scene at the hospital, Doherty was not satisfied with her performance and believed she could deliver a better one. Combs was initially unsure if that was something that she could physically and emotionally handle, but she acquiesced and the scene was filmed again to Doherty's approval. Concerning the filming of the episode, Krause admitted that he is normally not good at displaying emotion during dramatic scenes and credited Doherty with helping him bring out Leo's emotions. Doherty would go on to praise the performances of her fellow cast members in "All Hell Breaks Loose". By April 27, 2001, production on the episode was still underway, with Kern stating he had seen its rough cut.

=== Departure of Shannen Doherty and impact ===
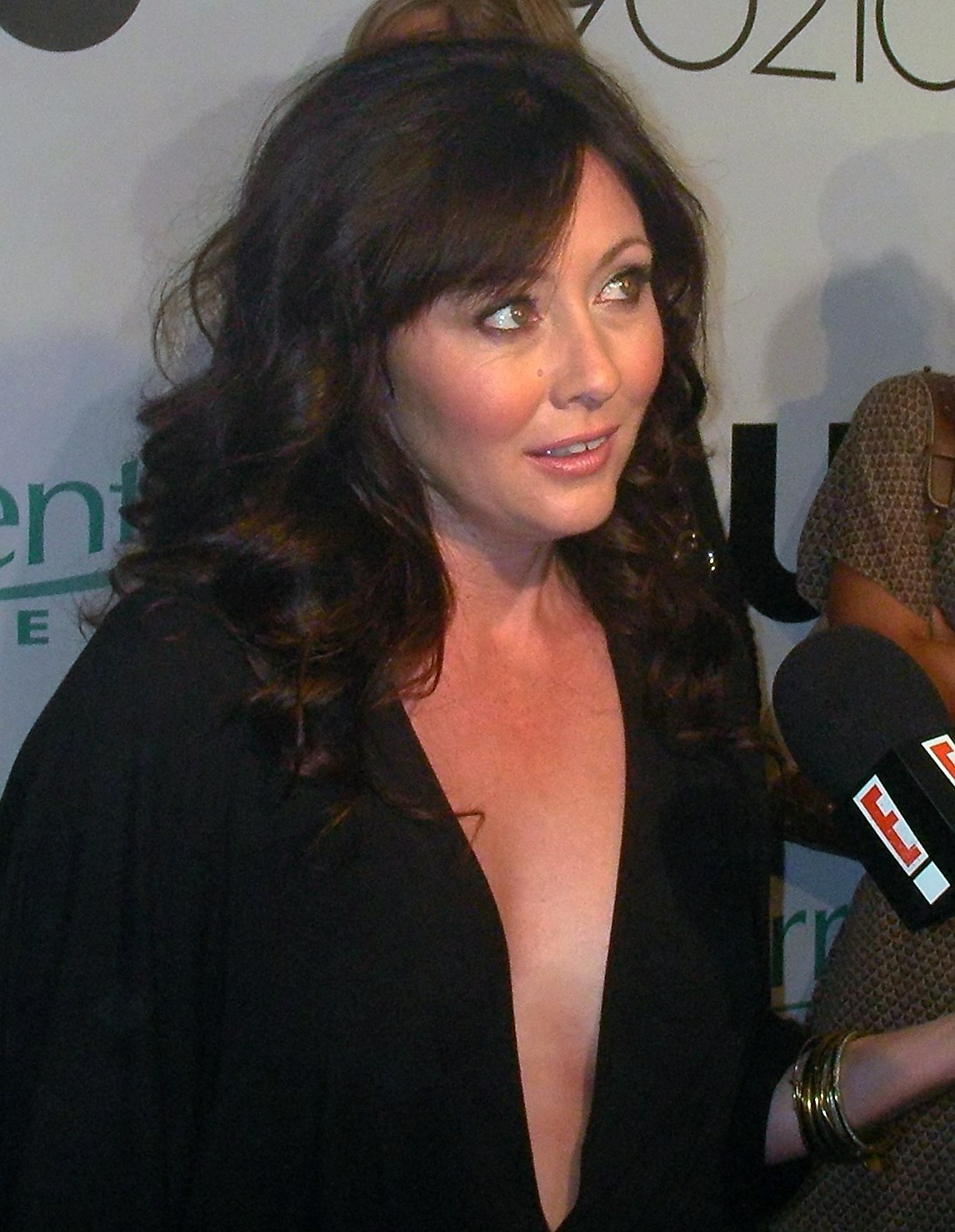
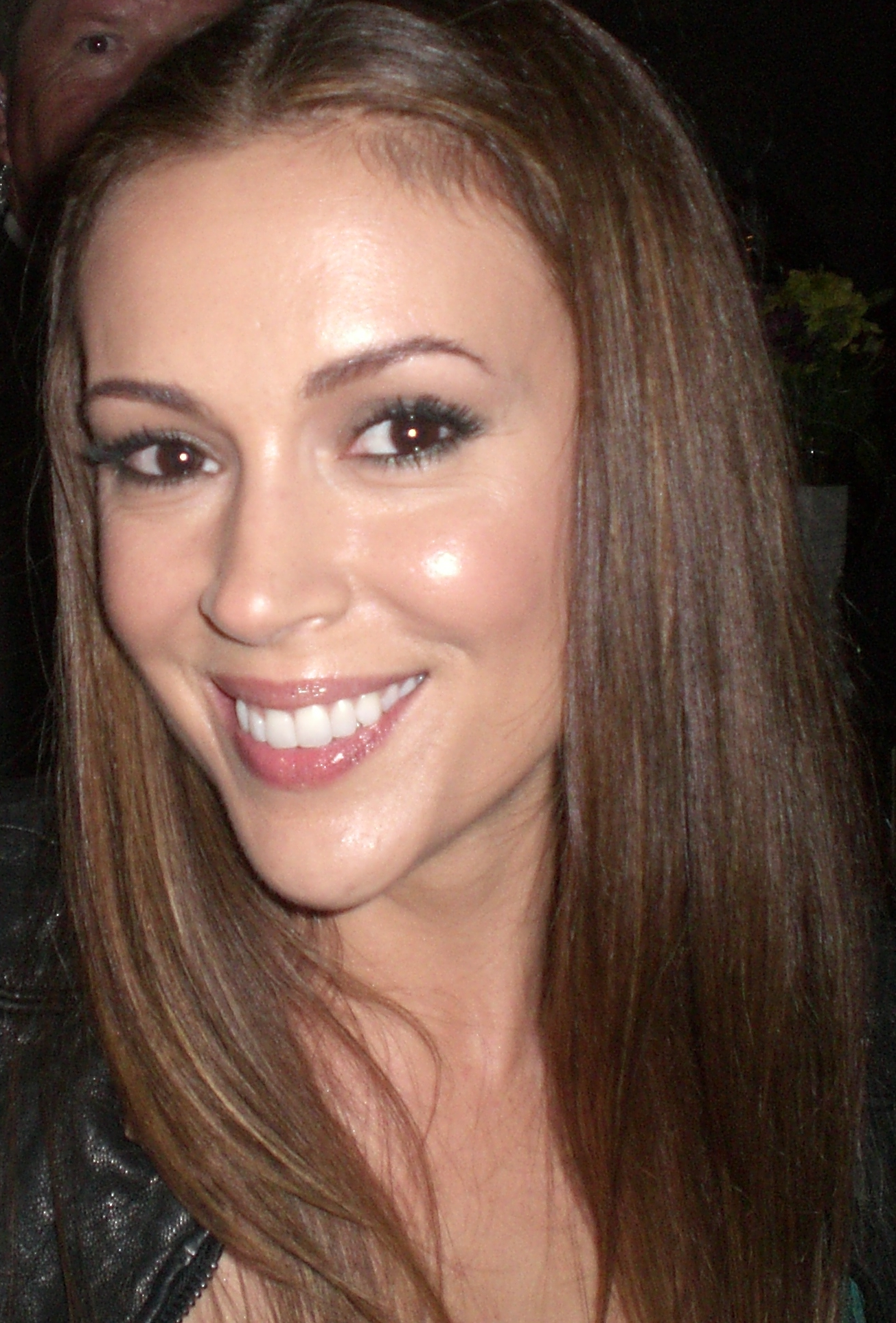
"All Hell Breaks Loose" was directed by Shannen Doherty (left; pictured in 2008) and marked her final appearance as Prue Halliwell. According to Doherty and other sources, she was fired from Charmed because of a feud with co-star Alyssa Milano (right; pictured in 2008) a week prior to the episode's airing, which resulted in Prue being killed off.

On May 10, a week before "All Hell Breaks Loose" aired, Doherty exited the series; Spelling Television released a statement about how "[they] didn't want to hold [Doherty] back from what she wanted to do". In June, ABC News reported that Doherty chose to leave so as to "seek other creative opportunities". Despite these statements, various media outlets reported that Doherty had a conflict with Charmed co-star Alyssa Milano, with the New York Daily News alleging that Milano had forced the network to fire one of them. During an interview with Entertainment Tonight, Doherty commented on her exit by stating there was "too much drama on the set [of Charmed] and not enough passion for the work", although she did not mention Milano by name.

Academic Karen A. Romanko stated in 2019 that while Doherty had expressed a dissatisfaction with the storylines of Charmed, her departure was facilitated by her feud with Milano. Doherty stated in 2023 that she was fired because of her feud with Milano; the Doherty-Milano feud was partly fuelled by Doherty being the highest-paid actress on Charmed. According to Combs—based on information Charmed producer Jonathan Levin had provided to her—Milano gave the producers an ultimatum and demanded that they fire either her or Doherty from the series; Milano also threatened to sue them for a hostile work environment.

Kern revealed in 2016 that "All Hell Breaks Loose" ending on a cliffhanger was intentional. According to him, having the episode end with the lives of Prue, Piper, and Phoebe in jeopardy "gave everyone options about what they were or were not going to do". Kern further clarified that had Doherty remained on the series, the cliffhanger would have been resolved differently in season four.

Following Doherty's departure, the producers initially planned to keep Prue alive and recast the role. Tiffani Thiessen was approached first, having previously replaced Doherty on Beverly Hills, 90210, but she declined the offer due to wanting to work on a sitcom. The role was then offered to Jennifer Love Hewitt, who also turned it down; Entertainment Weekly writer William Keck speculated Hewitt wanted to focus on her film career. Following this, it was decided in June 2001 to kill off Prue and replace her with a new Charmed One. According to Aaron Spelling, the show's producers planned on "recutting [the] season finale to explain [Prue's] sudden disappearance".

== Reception ==
=== Ratings ===
"All Hell Breaks Loose" was first broadcast on The WB on May 17, 2001. The original broadcast was watched by 5.26 million viewers, making it the 82nd most-watched prime time television program for the week of May 14 to 20, 2001, and the 3rd most-watched program on The WB. This marked an increase in viewership compared to the previous episode, "Look Who's Barking", which was watched by 4.68 million viewers. The episode received a Nielsen rating share of 3.4/5. This means that 3.4 percent of all households with a television viewed the episode, while among those households watching TV during this period, 5 percent of them were actively watching the program.

=== Critical response ===
"All Hell Breaks Loose" has been cited as one of Charmed's best episodes. The Guardian's Isabelle Oderberg and Sam Damshenas of Gay Times both described it as the strongest episode of Charmed, with Damshenas further labelling it as "one of the [greatest] of any fantasy drama ever". Ryan Keefer, in reviewing the third season for DVD Verdict, labelled the ending of "All Hell Breaks Loose" as a "defining moment for [Charmed]". Demian of Television Without Pity gave the episode an "A" grade and praised Combs' performance, especially during Piper's death scene.

Critics afforded much attention to Prue's death in the episode. Writing for Entertainment Weekly, Brianna Zigler argued that some of the best television series are willing to take risks and kill off one of their main characters, recognizing Charmed as one of the top examples of a program that "dared to kill off its protagonist". Paste's Lacy Baugher Milas, who praised the episode, echoed similar remarks and described Prue's death as a "shocking choice"; she did lament how it led to the show's declining quality. Conversely, Digital Spy's Hugh Armitage criticized Prue's death for taking place off-screen and being handled poorly. The Mary Sue writer El Kuiper argued that the majority of Charmed's "emotionally compelling" stories focused on Prue, with her story and death in "All Hell Breaks Loose" being the prime exemplar of this. Kuiper further stated that Prue's death had an emotional impact on the show's viewers.

The focus on the exposure of magic and Charmed Ones' status as witches, as well as the negative repercussions this has for them, was commended. Paste's Baugher Milas praised the episode's plot, arguing that "All Hell Breaks Loose" showcased Charmed's greatest strength being in showing the "more uncomfortable aspects of what being a witch could mean, both from a personal and professional perspective". In his review of the third season, television critic David Hofstede described the Halliwells' status as witches being exposed as the greatest moment from the season. Anthropologist Willem de Blécourt argues that the Bewitched episode "I Confess" (1968), the film Escape to Witch Mountain (1975), and the Sabrina the Teenage Witch episode "To Tell a Mortal" (1997) influenced "All Hell Breaks Loose"; de Blécourt notes how all four works share the central theme of "outsiders becoming aware of witches in a world that denies their existence, followed by the consequences of this revelation".

=== Cast response ===
In 2011, Doherty described "All Hell Breaks Loose" as her favorite episode out of the three she directed on Charmed. Despite this, Doherty stated in 2023 that if she had known about her departure from the series, she would have wanted for Prue's death to occur in a different fashion; she suggested having Piper getting possessed and using her powers to blow Prue up, with the fourth season showing Piper having to deal with causing her sister's death.

In 2025, Krause and Drew Fuller (who portrayed Chris Halliwell, the son of Piper and Leo) reviewed "All Hell Breaks Loose" on an episode of The House of Halliwell, a podcast dedicated to rewatching Charmed episodes. Both of them described the episode as one of their least favorite ones, criticizing its plot and describing the time loop storyline as not having been well executed. However, they commended Doherty's directing skills, with Fuller expressing that the episode "looks great" and praising the performances of the cast, stating that "everyone is just on their A-game".

Combs, who co-hosts The House of Halliwell alongside Krause and Fuller, refused to watch "All Hell Breaks Loose", giving the episode zero stars due to the events that transpired during its production and stating that it was "such massive insult to injury to let [Doherty] direct it and go out on this high note". Prior to this, in September 2001, Combs had criticized the decision to let Doherty go, arguing the character of Prue deserved a "graceful exit" that was planned out by the show's writers instead of being a last-minute change.

Rose McGowan, who replaced Doherty starting with the fourth season as the Charmed Ones' half-sister Paige Matthews, published her memoir Brave in 2018. In it, McGowan recounts her experience with being cast on Charmed and acknowledges that Prue was "unceremoniously killed off".
