= Charmed season 2 =

Season of television series

Charmed
- Season 2
- DVD cover
- Starring: Shannen Doherty; Holly Marie Combs; Alyssa Milano; Greg Vaughan; Dorian Gregory; Karis Paige Bryant; Brian Krause
- No. of episodes: 22

Release
- Original network: The WB
- Original release: September 30, 1999 – May 18, 2000

Season chronology
- ← Previous; Season 1 Next → Season 3

The second season of Charmed, an American supernatural drama television series created by Constance M. Burge, originally aired in the United States on The WB from September 30, 1999, through May 18, 2000. Airing on Thursdays at 9:00 pm. Paramount Home Entertainment released the complete second season in a six-disc box set on September 6, 2005. It was later released on high-definition blu-ray on October 22, 2019.

== Cast and characters ==
=== Main ===
- Shannen Doherty as Prue Halliwell / P. Bowen
- Holly Marie Combs as Piper Halliwell / P. Baxter
- Alyssa Milano as Phoebe Halliwell / P. Russell
- Greg Vaughan as Dan Gordon (Note: Vaughan is only credited for the episodes he appears in.) / Gordon Johnson
- Dorian Gregory as Darryl Morris (Note: Gregory is only credited for the episodes he appears in.)
- Karis Paige Bryant as Jenny Gordon (Note: Only credited in the episodes she appears in.)
- Brian Krause as Leo Wyatt (Note: Krause originally appeared in a recurring role before he was promoted to series regular for the episodes he's in.)

=== Recurring ===
- Lochlyn Munro as Jack Sheridan

=== Guest ===
- Jennifer Rhodes as Penny Halliwell
- Finola Hughes as Patty Halliwell
- Scott Jaeck as Sam Wilder
- Misha Collins as Eric Bragg
- Dean Norris as Collector #1
- Billy Drago as Barbas
- Hynden Walch as Marcey Steadwell
- Tyler Christopher as Anton
- Arnold Vosloo as Darklighter/Spirit Killer
- Amy Adams as Maggie Murphy
- Cameron Bancroft as Cryto
- Chris Payne Gilbert as Billy
- Robin Atkin Downes as Demon of Illusion
- Marcus Graham as Dragon Warlock

=== Special guest star ===
- Antonio Sabato Jr. as Bane Jessup

=== Special Musical Guest ===
- Dishwalla
- The Cranberries
- Janice Robinson
- Goo Goo Dolls
- Paula Cole

=== Special appearances ===
- Steve Railsback as Litvack
- French Stewart as Genie

== Episodes ==
No. overall	No. in season	Title	Directed by	Written by	Original release date	Prod. code	Viewers (millions)
23	1	"Witch Trial"	Craig Zisk	Brad Kern	September 30, 1999	4399022	5.12
The sisters face a demon named Abraxas, who steals the Book of Shadows and undoes some of the spells they've cast (in reverse order), releasing old vanquished enemies of the Charmed Ones and forcing them to remember the vanquishing spells from memory alone. The sisters have one chance to recapture the Book of Shadows or they will lose their powers forever, but Prue is still feeling guilt over Andy's death and becomes reluctant to prevent that. With her sister's encouragement and comfort, she is able to overcome her grief and together they retrieve the book and vanquish the demon. The sisters also meet their new neighbors, Jenny and her uncle Dan Gordon. Phoebe and Piper learn through the Wiccan community that because their anniversary of activating their inherent powers falls on an equinox, a wiccan holy day, each of their powers will be more developed and greatly magnified but only temporarily.
24	2	"Morality Bites"	John Behring	Chris Levinson & Zack Estrin	October 7, 1999	4399024	6.08
Prue and Piper use their powers to stop a man from repeatedly allowing his dog to defecate on their entry walk, even though this counts as magic for personal gain. When Phoebe has a vision of herself being burnt to death, the sisters travel ten years into the future to February 26, 2009 to learn what happened and why. In the future, Prue finds herself as a blond with a ruthless business reputation, Phoebe is in prison facing an imminent execution appointment, and Piper discovers that Leo is her ex-husband, and they have a daughter named Melinda. The sisters discover that Phoebe used her powers to kill a murderer, causing a local D.A. named Nathaniel Pratt to begin modern day witch trials as a platform for political office. Prue and Piper want to save Phoebe at any cost, but Leo feels that using their powers to save Phoebe will be a tipping point causing rhetoric to become legislation outlawing magic.
25	3	"The Painted World"	Kevin Inch	Constance M. Burge	October 14, 1999	4399023	6.39
Prue finds some mysterious words on an unusual painting at the auction house, which, when said aloud, send her into another dimension within the painting of a castle. There, Malcolm, the supposed innocent she finds and is determined to save is actually a warlock cursed into the painting by a witch, and he is hoping to get out of the painting to reunite with his fellow warlock lover, Jane. When Piper accidentally becomes trapped in the painting while trying to find Prue, it's up to Phoebe, who has cast a knowledge boosting spell for a job interview, to save them.
26	4	"The Devil's Music"	Richard Compton	David Simkins	October 21, 1999	4399025	5.32
Worried about cash flow in the struggling new P3 club, Phoebe and Prue conspire to take on a zero interest loan behind Piper's back, trusting that she will be able to make the club successful. Leo gets the manager of Dishwalla, Jeff Carlton, to bring the band to the club, fully aware that the manager has made a pact with the demon Masselin, who grants him fame and fortune in exchange for innocent souls. Detective Darryl Morris does not know this, but suspects that Carlton is involved in a string of mysterious disappearances of young women from Dishwalla's past concerts. On the night of the concert, Phoebe acts as bait for Masselin, and the sisters manage to feed him a potion which kills him, releasing all his victims.
27	5	"She's a Man, Baby, a Man!"	Martha Mitchell	Javier Grillo-Marxuach	November 4, 1999	4399026	5.28
As a heatwave descends on San Francisco, Phoebe begins to have erotic dreams that end in the killing of her dream lovers. The sisters find out that she is psychically linked, through her powers, to a man-killing sexual predator demon known as a Succubus that drains men of their testosterone. When they cast a spell, hoping to find and then vanquish the succubus, it turns Prue into a man.
28	6	"That Old Black Magic"	James L. Conway	Valerie Mayhew & Vivian Mayhew	November 11, 1999	4399027	5.87
A trio of film students are the victims of a heart-stealing evil witch, Tuatha (Brigid Brannagh), who escapes from over two hundred years of entombment, hunting for her wand. Leo returns to help get the wand into the hands of the only person who can use the wand for good, the Chosen One, and bumps into Piper who has a new love interest: Dan. Trying to put the awkwardness aside, Leo, Piper, and Phoebe find the Chosen One, who turns out to be a reluctant teenager named Kyle, while Prue stumbles across the wand. Ignoring Leo's warnings, the sisters attempt to find and defeat the witch and barely escape with their lives. Protected only by a fake courage potion concocted by Prue, Kyle saves the day, destroying the evil witch by using the wand. The victory becomes bittersweet when Leo faces Piper's choice to end their difficult romance and begin a new one with Dan.
29	7	"They're Everywhere"	Mel Damski	Sheryl J. Anderson	November 18, 1999	4399028	5.64
A band of knowledge-stealing warlocks named The Collectors hunt down a young man named Eric (Misha Collins) who uncovered the location of one of the greatest sources of power in the world, the Akashic Records. Meanwhile, Prue has her hands full with Jack Sheridan (Lochlyn Munro).
30	8	"P3 H2O"	John Behring	Chris Levinson & Zack Estrin	December 9, 1999	4399029	5.35
Prue, traumatized by witnessing her mother's drowning as a child, must face her greatest fear so that the sisters can destroy a water demon when they revisit the youth camp where their mother mysteriously drowned. In the process, they meet a stranger from their mother's past, who turns out to be her former Whitelighter, Sam Wilder, whom they find out was also her secret lover.
31	9	"Ms. Hellfire"	Craig Zisk	Story by : Constance M. Burge; Teleplay by : Constance M. Burge & Sheryl J. Anderson	January 13, 2000	4399030	4.72
An assassination attempt on the sisters' lives forces Prue to go undercover as the woman who tried to kill them, known as Ms. Hellfire. While undercover, she becomes romantically involved with Bane Jessup (Antonio Sabato Jr.) who hired the original Ms. Hellfire under orders from the sister's old foe, Barbas, the demon of fear. The sisters decide to reveal there secret to Darryl.
32	10	"Heartbreak City"	Michael Zinberg	David Simkins	January 20, 2000	4399031	5.04
A demon named Drasi steals Cupid's ring, which he uses to bring couples together, to tear them apart. Now Cupid must convince the Halliwells to help him get it back before Drasi breaks all of the relationships, thus killing Cupid.
33	11	"Reckless Abandon"	Craig Zisk	Javier Grillo-Marxuach	January 27, 2000	4399032	7.48
The sisters must find a way to vanquish a ghost who is intent on killing all of the men in a family line, including the last male, a baby named Matthew.
34	12	"Awakened"	Anson Williams	Valerie Mayhew & Vivian Mayhew	February 3, 2000	4399033	4.78
When Piper contracts a life-threatening virus that sends her to intensive care, Prue and Phoebe cast an 'awakening' spell to save her life. Since the spell was used for personal gain, the sisters can no longer sleep, and Piper's sickness spreads into an epidemic as a direct consequence. Meanwhile, Prue quits her job at Buckland's and Phoebe enrolls in college. The sisters reverse the spell and Leo heals Piper against the wishes of his handlers who suspend him from his duties as a Whitelighter.
35	13	"Animal Pragmatism"	Don Kurt	Chris Levinson & Zack Estrin	February 10, 2000	4399034	5.28
A group of lonely mortal women in Phoebe's college class cast a spell that turns three animals (a snake, a pig, and a rabbit) into men who wreak havoc on the town. Meanwhile, Prue adjusts to life being unemployed by helping out at the club.
36	14	"Pardon My Past"	John Paré	Michael Gleason	February 17, 2000	4399035	4.96
Phoebe experiences flashes of one of her past lives when she and her sisters were cousins in the 1920s. However, in this past life, Phoebe was evil and power-mad and a curse was bestowed upon her that could affect future Phoebe's life.
37	15	"Give Me A Sign"	James A. Contner	Sheryl J. Anderson	February 24, 2000	4399036	5.44
A demon known as Litvack orders his henchmen to kill Bane Jessup, who Prue helped put behind bars when he tried to have the Charmed Ones killed. Bane kidnaps Prue but all he wants is help from her. Meanwhile, Phoebe casts a spell that will give Piper a sign when it comes to choice of her true love.
38	16	"Murphy's Luck"	John Behring	David Simkins	March 30, 2000	4399037	4.58
After Prue prevents a woman named Maggie Murphy (Amy Adams) from committing suicide, a Darklighter (Arnold Vosloo) puts a curse on her that throws her into a depression that could cost her life.
39	17	"How to Make a Quilt Out of Americans"	Kevin Inch	Story by : Javier Grillo-Marxuach; Teleplay by : Javier Grillo-Marxuach & Robert Masello	April 6, 2000	4399038	4.66
A group of three elderly witches, Gail, Helen and Amanda, one of them a close friend of the sisters' grandmother, summon a demon named Cryto to restore their youth. However, in return, Cryto wants the powers of the Charmed Ones.
40	18	"Chick Flick"	Michael Schultz	Zack Estrin & Chris Levinson	April 20, 2000	4399039	4.06
Piper and Leo attempt to have a normal date, but find it difficult because of Leo being a Whitelighter and Piper being a witch. Meanwhile, the Demon of Illusion brings to life characters from horror movies, including Bloody Mary, in an attempt to kill the Charmed Ones. Their greatest ally is Phoebe's child-hood crush; an old movie character named Billy (Chris Payne Gilbert).
41	19	"Ex Libris"	Joel J. Feigenbaum	Story by : Peter Chomsky; Teleplay by : Brad Kern	April 27, 2000	4399040	4.34
The sisters must find the demon Libris who is responsible for the murder of one of Phoebe's classmates, Charlene (Rebecca Cross), because she was getting close to proving that demons exist. Meanwhile, Dan discovers that Leo was previously married, and decides to take matters into his own hands, while Prue attempts to help a man (Cleavant Derricks) who is looking for a witness to his daughter's murder. The Goo Goo Dolls perform.
42	20	"Astral Monkey"	Craig Zisk	Story by : Constance M. Burge; Teleplay by : Constance M. Burge & David Simkins	May 4, 2000	4399041	4.54
Prue gets her face on TV, because pictures taken by the paparazzi make people believe that she is dating a popular actor. Meanwhile, the doctor that treated Piper when she was critically ill, discovers and gains the sisters' powers. After being twisted by the magic now within him, he goes on a sadistic organ-harvesting spree, targeting criminals in the streets.
43	21	"Apocalypse Not"	Michael Zinberg	Story by : Sanford Golden; Teleplay by : Sheryl J. Anderson	May 11, 2000	4399042	4.38
When a vanquishing spell goes awry while the Halliwells try to destroy the Four Horsemen of the Apocalypse, Prue and one of the Horsemen named War become trapped in a vortex. Piper and Phoebe enlist the help of the three remaining Horsemen to free Prue and the fourth Horseman before the vortex closes.
44	22	"Be Careful What You Witch For"	Shannen Doherty	Story by : Brad Kern; Teleplay by : Chris Levinson & Zack Estrin & Brad Kern	May 18, 2000	4399043	4.54
A Genie, employed by the evil "Council" and a Dragon Warlock to steal the sisters' powers, offers to grant each sister one wish for whatever they most desire. But when they refuse, the genie tricks them into wishing, resulting in an uncontrollable power for Phoebe, Prue's death, and the rapid aging of Dan, who finally learns Piper's secret.
