= Charmed season 3 =

Season of television series

Charmed
- Season 3
- DVD cover
- Starring: Shannen Doherty; Holly Marie Combs; Alyssa Milano; Brian Krause; Dorian Gregory; Julian McMahon
- No. of episodes: 22

Release
- Original network: The WB
- Original release: October 5, 2000 – May 17, 2001

Season chronology
- ← Previous; Season 2 Next → Season 4

The third season of Charmed, an American supernatural drama television series created by Constance M. Burge, originally aired in the United States on The WB from October 5, 2000, through May 17, 2001. Paramount Home Entertainment released the complete third season in a six-disc box set on November 15, 2005. It was later released on high-definition blu-ray on May 18, 2021.

The series follows the adventures of Prue (Shannen Doherty), Piper (Holly Marie Combs) and Phoebe Halliwell (Alyssa Milano), three sisters who discover they are the Charmed Ones, the most powerful good witches of all time who use their combined Power of Three to protect innocents from evil beings. Other regular cast members include Brian Krause as Leo Wyatt and Dorian Gregory as Darryl Morris, both of whom return from the previous season as well as Julian McMahon as Cole Turner, who is introduced in the season premiere.

It is the last season to feature original cast member Shannen Doherty.

== Cast and characters ==
=== Main ===
- Shannen Doherty as Prue Halliwell
- Holly Marie Combs as Piper Halliwell
- Alyssa Milano as Phoebe Halliwell
- Brian Krause as Leo Wyatt
- Dorian Gregory as Darryl Morris (Note: Gregory is only credited for the episodes he appears in.)
- Julian McMahon as Cole Turner (Note: McMahon is only credited for the episodes he appears in.)

=== Special guest ===
- Ron Perlman as Kellman

=== Recurring ===
- Amir Aboulela as Triad Member #1
- Shaun Toub as Triad Member #2
- Rick Overton as Triad Member #3
- Keith Diamond as Reece Davidson
- James Read as Victor Bennett
- Jennifer Rhodes as Penny Halliwell
- Finola Hughes as Patty Halliwell

=== Guest ===
- Audrey Wasilewski as Natalie
- Elizabeth Harnois as Brooke
- Rick Hearst as Troxa
- Eddie Cahill as Sean
- Harry Groener as Father Thomas
- Jason Carter as Andras
- Rainn Wilson as Kierkan
- Steve Valentine as Eames
- Dana Ashbrook as T.J.
- Simon Templeman as Angel of Death
- W. Earl Brown as Shadow
- Sherri Saum as Ariel
- Kevin Weisman as Lukas
- Ian Buchanan as Raynor
- Rachel Luttrell as Janna

=== Special Musical Guest ===
- Barenaked Ladies
- Snake River Conspiracy
- Marvelous 3
- Idol
- Fastball
- Box
- Orgy

=== Special Appearance by ===
- Buff Bagwell as Slammer
- Booker T. Huffman as Thunder
- Scott Steiner as Mega-Man

== Episodes ==
No. overall	No. in season	Title	Directed by	Written by	Original release date	Prod. code	U.S. viewers (millions)
45	1	"The Honeymoon's Over"	James L. Conway	Brad Kern	October 5, 2000	62015-03-045	7.65
While Piper and Leo are away for a month seeing The Elders, Prue and Phoebe must face a series of demons known as Guardians, who help mortal murderers go free in exchange for the souls of their victims. After saving Darryl from a Guardian, Prue and Phoebe must testify in court, where it is later revealed that the judge and all the other people in the court room are demons. Phoebe falls in love with the District Attorney Cole Turner (Julian McMahon), however she does not know he is a demon sent by The Triad to kill the Charmed Ones. Meanwhile, Piper and Leo return and reveal that The Elders want them to end their relationship or else the sisters will get a new Whitelighter. However, Leo decides to propose to Piper in secret.
46	2	"Magic Hour"	John Behring	Zack Estrin & Chris Levinson	October 12, 2000	62015-03-046	5.10
The sisters must help a young man who is turned into an owl by day and his girlfriend who is turned into a wolf by night. The two lovers have been cursed by the woman's warlock boss, who will lift the curse once she gives in to him or whenever there is a 'night within a day'. Meanwhile, Piper and Leo try to find a way to hide their wedding from The Elders. However, they eventually find out about the wedding and send Leo away during the ceremony. This episode was heavily inspired by the 1985 fantasy film Ladyhawke.
47	3	"Once Upon a Time"	Joel J. Feigenbaum	Krista Vernoff	October 19, 2000	62015-03-047	5.37
While Piper worries that Leo will never return, Prue and Phoebe try to save a little girl named Kate and a Fairy Princess named Thistle from evil trolls who lurk in the "tweens" and want to capture the princess. When Prue and Phoebe need Piper's help, her concern with Leo causes a spell to backfire, placing Kate in more danger. Meanwhile, Cole, who appears in his demonic form Belthazor, tries to steal the Book of Shadows.
48	4	"All Halliwell's Eve"	Anson Williams	Sheryl J. Anderson	October 26, 2000	62015-03-048	6.53
On Halloween, a local coven leader from the 1600s named Eva (Clare Carey), summons the sisters back in time to save a witch named Charlotte (Sadie Stratton) and her soon-to-be born child from an evil witch named Ruth Cobb (Judy Geeson), who wants to raise the child evil. It is later revealed that the child in the womb is the sisters' ancestor Melinda Warren and Cole travels back in time to capture her at birth. Meanwhile, back in the present time, Leo and Darryl try to fight off two Grimlocks who were vanquished by the Charmed Ones once before, but were brought back by the power of Halloween.
49	5	"Sight Unseen"	Perry Lang	William Schmidt	November 2, 2000	62015-03-049	5.72
Prue becomes obsessed with learning more about The Triad, and thinks that they are launching an attack when the manor is burglarized with her personal items missing. Piper cannot concentrate whenever she is with Leo in a romantic setting because she fears that The Elders are always watching them. Meanwhile, Cole discovers that a demon named Troxa is trying to kill the sisters.
50	6	"Primrose Empath"	Mel Damski	Daniel Cerone	November 9, 2000	62015-03-051	6.09
Unwittingly following the signs laid out by Cole, Prue comes into contact with a seemingly innocent shut-in, Vinceres, who refuses to leave his apartment that is about to be demolished. The man is faced with unendurable pain caused by his ability of feeling all of the emotions of the city. After learning the man is an Empath, she casts a spell to relieve him of his power, but it is transferred to her. Prue is later told he is a demon given this power to serve as a curse, causing him the inability to prey on witches or innocents. She nearly goes insane from bearing this gift that she was not meant to have. But Prue eventually overcomes it, intensifying the pain Vinceres felt by finally astral-projecting into his body and destroying him.
51	7	"Power Outage"	Craig Zisk	Monica Breen & Alison Schapker	November 16, 2000	62015-03-050	5.67
In an attempt to destroy the Charmed Ones, Cole enlists the help of Andras, a demon who magnifies anger into rage. Meanwhile, when the sisters lose their magic after using their powers against each other, they are left defenseless against attacks from The Triad and Belthazor.
52	8	"Sleuthing with the Enemy"	Noel Nosseck	Peter Hume	December 14, 2000	62015-03-052	5.53
When the sisters discover that Cole is Belthazor (Michael Bailey Smith), Phoebe must make one of the toughest decisions of her life: either vanquish her boyfriend or keep one of the most dangerous demons known to exist alive.
53	9	"Coyote Piper"	Chris Long	Krista Vernoff	January 11, 2001	62015-03-053	5.12
Prue and Phoebe have their hands full when Piper is possessed by the evil spirit named Terra, on the day of her high school reunion.
54	10	"We All Scream for Ice Cream"	Allan Kroeker	Chris Levinson & Zack Estrin	January 18, 2001	62015-03-054	5.44
The sisters trace a mysterious ice-cream van operator who abducts children, but the evil may not be who they initially suspect. Meanwhile, the girls' dad Victor comes for a visit.
55	11	"Blinded by the Whitelighter"	David Straiton	Nell Scovell	January 25, 2001	62015-03-055	5.44
The sisters must stop the warlock Eames (Steve Valentine) from executing his plan to steal specific powers from witches in his attempt to kill every Whitelighter in the world.
56	12	"Wrestling with Demons"	Joel J. Feigenbaum	Sheryl J. Anderson	February 1, 2001	62015-03-056	5.91
Prue discovers that her former college boyfriend is being led down the path to becoming a demon, and the sisters must risk their lives in an underworld wrestling ring to save his soul.
57	13	"Bride and Gloom"	Chris Long	William Schmidt	February 8, 2001	62015-03-057	5.37
When a shapeshifting warlock tricks Prue into a shot-gun wedding in order to steal the Book of Shadows, Phoebe and Piper are lured to the dark side and begin to enjoy their new evil powers.
58	14	"The Good, the Bad and the Cursed"	Shannen Doherty	Monica Breen & Alison Schapker	February 15, 2001	62015-03-058	5.15
Phoebe feels the pain of an injured Native American named Bo trapped in a time loop of a deserted town she visits. Prue and Cole enter the time loop that is stuck in the mid-1800s to save Bo, and Phoebe, from death at the hands of a local thug, and break the time loop.
59	15	"Just Harried"	Mel Damski	Daniel Cerone	February 22, 2001	62015-03-059	5.79
On the day of Piper and Leo's wedding, Prue's astrally-projected self adopts an uninhibited, wild personality that threatens to ruin the wedding and place her in jail for murder.
60	16	"Death Takes a Halliwell"	Jon Paré	Krista Vernoff	March 15, 2001	62015-03-060	5.42
Prue, growing weary of her battles to save innocents and in fighting off the Angel of Death, is forced to turn her back on a dying soul, and must come to grips with her feelings towards fate and the death of her mother.
61	17	"Pre-Witched"	David Straiton	Chris Levinson & Zack Estrin	March 22, 2001	62015-03-061	5.09
While the sisters must deal with the possibility of being separated as Piper and Leo plan to move out on their own, they recall a time before they knew they were the Charmed Ones, when the girls were coming to grips with the death of Grams and Phoebe's departure to New York.
62	18	"Sin Francisco"	Joel J. Feigenbaum	Nell Scovell	April 19, 2001	62015-03-062	4.03
A demon named Lucas wielding the Seven Deadly Sins uses his powers against The Charmed Ones. Phoebe becomes infected with lust, Prue with pride, Piper with gluttony, and Leo with sloth. It is revealed that those infected with one of the sins may self-destruct due to the nature of the infection.
63	19	"The Demon Who Came in from the Cold"	Anson Williams	Sheryl J. Anderson	April 26, 2001	62015-03-063	3.46
Cole poses as Belthazor to infiltrate an internet organization run by evil, that plans on controlling the world's information flow on the internet. Meanwhile, the sisters must vanquish the warlock posing as the company's manager without exposing Cole's role in the situation.
64	20	"Exit Strategy"	Joel J. Feigenbaum	Story by : Peter Hume; Teleplay by : Peter Hume & Daniel Cerone	May 3, 2001	62015-03-064	4.07
The evil Brotherhood plots to sabotage Cole's relationship with Phoebe in an attempt to turn him back to evil. Meanwhile, Piper develops a new power, the ability to accelerate the molecules in an object.
65	21	"Look Who's Barking"	John Behring	Story by : Curtis Kheel; Teleplay by : Curtis Kheel & Monica Breen & Alison Schapker	May 10, 2001	62015-03-065	4.68
Phoebe has a premonition of a young woman being killed by a demon in a phone booth whilst adding on to the Belthazor section of the Book of Shadows, thus causing her to think Cole is responsible. However, the sisters realize that this murder does not follow Cole's pattern. Piper learns that it is actually the demon on the reverse page that's responsible; a Banshee. The sisters then cast a spell to track down the banshee which turns Prue into a dog, but Prue gets hit by a car. The driver takes her home to care for her, thus taking her out of the action. When the banshee attacks the Halliwell manor she surprises Phoebe in the attic and, sensing her immense pain, which is what the banshee feeds on, over Cole's betrayal, screams at her. It is later discovered that although this scream would kill mortals, it has a very different effect on witches: it turns them into a banshee too. Piper blows the Banshee up but it is too late, Phoebe has already turned into a banshee. Leo warns Piper that if Phoebe kills, she will stay a banshee forever.
66	22	"All Hell Breaks Loose"	Shannen Doherty	Brad Kern	May 17, 2001	62015-03-066	5.26
Prue and Piper bring a doctor to the manor, to protect him from a powerful demonic assassin named Shax, who was sent by The Source. When Shax breaks into the manor, he throws Prue and Piper through a wall, causing them to almost die, until Leo arrives with enough time to heal them. Phoebe uses a vanquishing spell on Shax but it does not kill him. While searching for Shax out in the streets, Prue and Piper are caught on live television using their powers, thus exposing themselves as witches. Phoebe goes to the Underworld to find Cole and while there, they are forced to strike a deal with Tempus to travel back in time to before it was revealed that magic existed. They travel back successfully but Phoebe, Cole, and Leo are now trapped in the Underworld, leaving Prue and Piper lying unconscious on the floor from when Shax blasted them in his initial attack.
