= Murphy's Luck =

Murphy's Luck may refer to:

- Murphy's law: "Anything that can go wrong will go wrong"
- "Murphy's Luck", an episode from the television series Charmed
