= Something Wicca This Way Comes =

Pilot episode of Charmed

- Charmed episode
- Episode no.: Season 1 Episode 1
- Directed by: John T. Kretchmer
- Written by: Constance M. Burge
- Production code: 1498704
- Original air date: October 7, 1998

Guest appearances
- Eric Scott Woods as Jeremy Burns; Matthew Ashford as Roger; Chris Flanders as Chef Moore

Episode chronology
← Previous —	Next → "I've Got You Under My Skin"
- Charmed (season 1)

"Something Wicca This Way Comes" is the first episode of the television series Charmed. Written by series creator and executive producer Constance M. Burge and directed by John T. Kretchmer, it was first broadcast in the United States on The WB on October 7, 1998. "Something Wicca This Way Comes" was the highest-rated episode of Charmed in the entire series. It was watched by 7.7 million viewers and broke the record for the highest-rated premiere episode in The WB's history, being later surpassed by the pilot episode of Smallville.

The series focuses on the lives of three Halliwell sisters, known as the Charmed Ones: Prue (Shannen Doherty), Piper (Holly Marie Combs) and Phoebe Halliwell (Alyssa Milano), as they deal with their grandmother's death and learn that they inherited a little more than the house they grew up in. All three of them have inherited magic powers; Prue has the power of telekinesis, Piper has the power to freeze time, and Phoebe has the power of premonition. Together they try to live everyday normal lives in San Francisco, while battling demons and warlocks, and keeping their supernatural identities a secret.

The name of this episode is a play on words from Shakespeare's Macbeth: "By the pricking of my thumbs, something wicked this way comes."

== Plot ==
In San Francisco, witch Serena Fredrick (Lonnie Partridge) is murdered in her apartment by an unidentified man. Homicide Inspectors Darryl Morris (Dorian Gregory) and Andy Trudeau (T.W. King) investigate her murder. Andy tells Darryl that he suspects witchcraft is involved, but Darryl dismisses the idea.

Piper (Holly Marie Combs) arrives late at Halliwell Manor, which she and her sisters Prue (Shannen Doherty) and Phoebe (Alyssa Milano) inherited from their recently deceased grandmother. Prue mentions that Piper's boyfriend Jeremy (Eric Scott Woods) has sent some flowers and a bottle of Port, the ingredient she needs for her showpiece recipe in the morning. Piper notices an old spirit board that Prue found in the basement while searching for a circuit tester. She turns it over and reads the inscription on the back: "To my three beautiful girls, may this give you the light to find the shadows the power of three will set you free. Love, Mom."

The pair then begin to wonder about Phoebe, who is living in New York. Prue suggests they should rent out the spare room at a reduced rate in exchange for fixing things around the house. Piper suggests that Phoebe could move in before admitting that two weeks earlier she had agreed to allow their unemployed, penniless sister to move back in. Prue is not happy with this since she and Phoebe had fallen out over Prue's former fiancé, Roger (Matthew Ashford). Months earlier, Prue had broken off the engagement because she believes he and Phoebe slept together.

After a tense reunion with Prue, Phoebe joins Piper in playing with the spirit board. As Piper goes into the kitchen, the pointer on the spirit board starts to spell a word. Frightened, Phoebe tries to convince her sisters that the pointer is moving, but they do not believe her. Piper then sees the pointer move briefly and then the spirit board finally spells out the word "attic" as Phoebe writes it down. As the storm continues, the power goes out. Piper and Prue head off to the fuse panel, but Phoebe follows the spirit board's prompt and heads to the attic. The door opens and Phoebe is guided to a wooden chest, in which she discovers a large, ancient book called the Book of Shadows. Overcome with curiosity, she reads a page aloud, which mentions the "power of three" having the active powers of an ancestor named Melinda Warren. The spell bestows Phoebe with premonitions, Piper with molecular immobilization, and Prue with telekinesis.

Prue tells Phoebe that the book is witchcraft, but they don't believe her. In the morning, Prue is confronted by Roger, who is also her boss. He removes her from the project she had been managing. Prue quits her job, but her anger unintentionally causes her to make his pen explode and nearly strangle him with his necktie. Piper runs out of time and can't finish her dish until she accidentally freezes the restaurant's chef, which allows her to complete the sauce and secure the job. While Phoebe is riding her bike, she sees a premonition of two boys on roller skates being hit by a car, but she saves them by crashing her bike into the car.

Prue sees her power in action for the first time when putting cream in her drink. While Prue is in a pharmacy looking for aspirin, Phoebe observes that Prue uses her power when she is angry. Phoebe winds her sister up over Roger and their father, which causes Prue to knock most of the stock off the shelves. Meanwhile, Piper is on a date with Jeremy, who is actually a warlock who steals the powers of good witches. Jeremy says that he has always known that Piper and her sisters are witches, which is why he started dating Piper six months earlier. He then shows Piper Serena's powers, revealing himself as her murderer. While Jeremy attempts to stab Piper with an athame, she freezes him and escapes before telling Prue and Phoebe what happened. The trio then create a potion which injures Jeremy, and Phoebe has a premonition that he has been wounded but not defeated. After trying to blockade themselves from Jeremy, Prue remembers the inscription on the spirit board and begin chanting, "The power of three will set us free", which destroys Jeremy.

== Production ==
An unaired pilot for the series was first shot, with some scenes filmed in the actual manor that is shown on the show, located at 1329 Carroll Avenue in Los Angeles. Lori Rom and Chris Boyd were originally cast to play Phoebe and Andy, and were later recast. After Lori Rom leaving Charmed, executive producer Aaron Spelling asked Alyssa Milano, whom he knew from Melrose Place, to be her replacement and the show moved to a sound studio.

The unaired pilot is featured in a bonus disc of some editions of the complete series DVD releases.

== Reception ==
In 2016, Gavin Hetherington of SpoilerTV ran a series of Charmed articles in the run-up to the 10th anniversary of the series finale. The first was a complete season review of season one, including the pilot episode, in which Gavin comments that the episode is a "classic", and that he "loved the episode".

=== Cast Response ===
In September of 2022, three cast members, Holly Marie Combs, Brian Krause, and Drew Fuller who played the characters Piper, Leo, and Chris created a podcast in which they would rewatch the episodes of Charmed and talk about them. The first episode was about the first episode of Charmed, "Something Wicca This Way Comes." In this episode the cast rates what they thought of it. Krause gave the episode an 8 out of 10 with no further explanation. Fuller gave it and 8 almost a 9, and they explained why. He believed that there was nothing else like it on TV at the time, and he appreciated the dark and mysterious elements of the first episode. Combs, being the only one of the three who were actually in this episode opted to not rate this time.
