= Power Outage =

Power Outage may refer to:

- Power outage, a term which refers to electrical power failure
- "Power Outage" (Charmed), an episode of the television series Charmed
- "Power Outage" (The Flash), an episode of the television series The Flash
