= The truth is out there =

The truth is out there may refer to:

- "THE TRUTH IS OUT THERE", tagline of The X-Files
- "The Truth Is Out There...and It Hurts", an episode of Charmed
- "The Truth is Out There" (NCIS), an episode of NCIS
- The Truth Is Out There, a song by Sonata Arctica

== See also ==
- Truth
- 9/11 Truth Movement
- To Tell the Truth
