= Adolf Rosenberger =

American businessman

- Born: April 8, 1900; Pforzheim, Germany
- Died: December 6, 1967 (aged 67); Los Angeles, California, USA
- Citizenship: American
- Occupation: Businessman
- Known for: Co-founder and business manager of car company Porsche
- Relatives: Brad Kern (nephew)

Adolf Rosenberger (8 April 1900 - 6 December 1967) was a successful German-Jewish businessman and co-founder of the Porsche car company.

A racing driver, he raced Mercedes and Benz cars in the 1920s. His successes and records included wins at Avus, Stuttgart Solitude in 1924 and 1925, the Kasseler Herkules Hillclimb, and the Klausenpassrennen. At the 1926 German Grand Prix, Rosenberger was involved in one of the numerous accidents in treacherous conditions. He survived a crash into the timekeepers' box, which killed its three occupants.

Following the Aryanization and after the Holocaust, Rosenberger, a Jew, was deprived of his stake-holdings and position in the Porsche company.

== Career ==
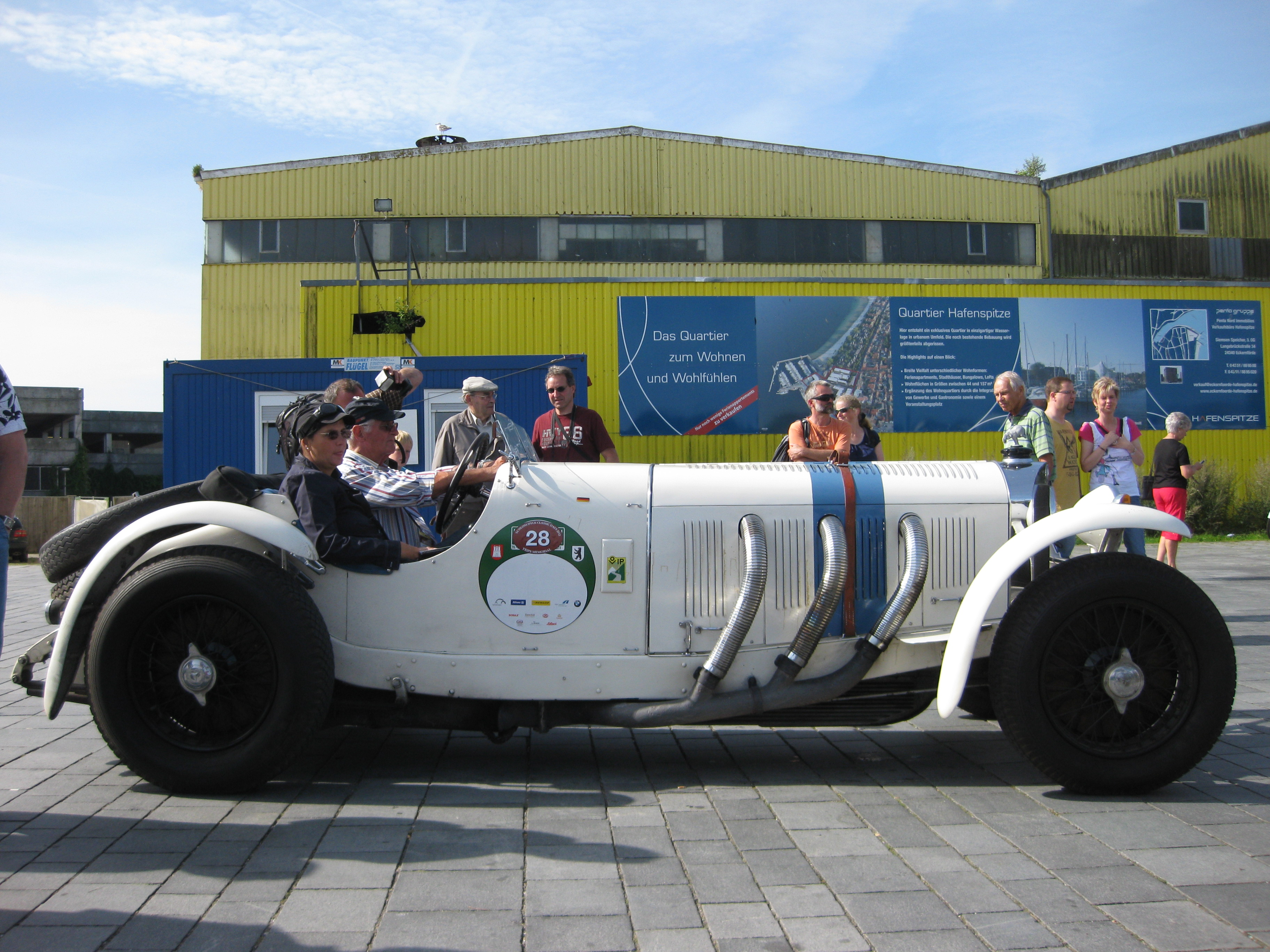
Mercedes-Benz SSK (1929)

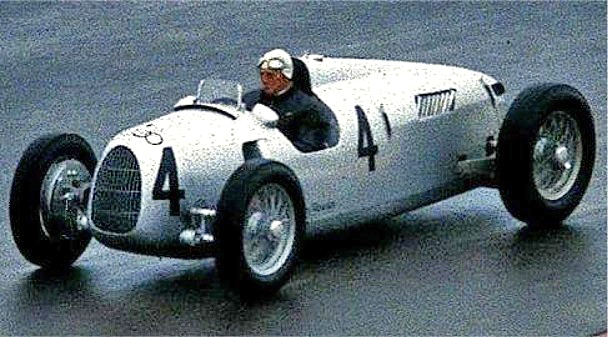
Auto-Union-Rennwagen (Typ C)

In 1931, he founded the Porsche GmbH together with Ferdinand Porsche and Dr. Anton Piëch. With Rosenberger's financial backing, Ferdinand Porsche and Anton Piëch started the company with some former co-workers including chief designer Karl Rabe. Rosenberger was also instrumental in the creation of the Auto Union concern, being credited with influencing Porsche's choice of a mid-engined design for the Auto Union racing cars.

Despite Rosenberger's contribution to the development of German automobiles and German auto racing, when Hitler came to power in Germany, Rosenberger, a Jew, was arrested for Rassenschande (“racial crimes”), and imprisoned at the concentration camp Schloss Kislau near Karlsruhe. He was released by the goodwill of a colleague, Hans Baron Veyder Mahlberg, who bribed Gestapo agents, but he was forced to leave Germany immediately.

He emigrated to France and later to Great Britain, representing Porsche GmbH in both of those countries. He immigrated to the United States in 1939, and in 1944, he became a US citizen under the name of Alan Arthur Robert. He moved to California, where he was active in motorsports and the automobile business. He died in Los Angeles, California, in 1967.

== Legacy ==
In 2022 a study of Rosenberger's role at Porsche was commissioned to clarify and correct the corporate history.
