= Dorian Gregory =

American actor and television host

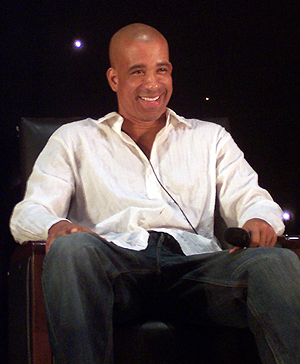
- Gregory in 2006
- Born: January 26, 1971 (age 55); Washington, D.C., U.S.
- Occupations: Actor, television host
- Years active: 1991–present

Dorian Gregory (born January 26, 1971) is an American actor and television host who played Darryl Morris on the television show Charmed (1998–2005) and was the fourth and final permanent host of Soul Train, replacing Shemar Moore.

== Background ==
Gregory was born in Washington, D.C., and raised in Cleveland, Ohio, until age nine, when he and his family moved to Los Angeles, California. He began his acting career with guest roles on such series as Baywatch, Beverly Hills, 90210, and Sister, Sister, among others. His first major role was in the main cast of Baywatch Nights from 1996 to 1997.

== Career ==
In 1998, he played the police officer Darryl Morris in the television series Charmed, which he played until end of season 7, in 2005, when the character was cut due to budget reasons. His role gained importance after the death of character Andy Trudeau at the end of season 1. Though suspicious of the main characters when the series started, he becomes their ally during season 2 and helps the sisters cover up unsolved murder cases and missing persons cases.

In 2002, he replaced cosmetic surgeon Jan Adams as one of the hosts of the male-oriented daytime talk show, The Other Half, which was canceled the following year.

Gregory has hosted several events, such as the BET Anniversary and Achievement Awards with Debbie Allen and Shirley Moore, the Black Stuntwomen Beach Competition, and the Elite Lee Jeans Model Look with Roshumba Williams and Angelica Bridges. He has also hosted a radio show on black writers, supports minority filmmakers, and appeared at high school dedications to support better educational opportunities. He is a founding member of Epiphany Theater Group, established by writer/producer/director Bill Duke. In 2010, Gregory made an impromptu appearance on The Tonight Show with Jay Leno in the "Jaywalking segment". Jay Leno was apparently unaware of who Gregory was until Gregory informed him.

== Personal life ==
Gregory is actively involved in the Jeopardy Program, sponsored by the Los Angeles Police Department for youth at risk, as well as serving as the National Spokesman for the Juvenile Diabetes Research Foundation. He was diagnosed with Juvenile (Type 1) diabetes when he was a child, and now talks to young adults and children on the subject as a motivational speaker. Gregory is working to raise funds to help find a cure for diabetes and offering information to support people living with the disease. He is also involved with AIDS Project Los Angeles and Mothers Against Drunk Driving (MADD).

Gregory has a music group with his sister, Mercedes Bey, called "MD Says", which stands for "Mercedes and Dorian Says". Their group has music running in Europe as well as domestic pick ups. He is also cutting more songs for a long-awaited album release.

He began his writing career as a poet (and penned "Ashley Moore" and "Deep Deep Purple"). His passion for writing progressed naturally into music, and has evolved to writing plays and movie scripts, including the play Room Mates for Life. He has written several short stories and has been involved with various artists.

== Filmography ==
=== Film ===
Year	Title	Role	Notes
1992	Stop! Or My Mom Will Shoot	Driver for 'Moore' at Airport	
1995	The Barefoot Executive	Doctor	TV movie
1997	The Apocalypse	Lieutenant	
1997	Just Write	Valet at the Mansion Party	
2003	Deliver Us from Eva	Lucius Johnson	
2005	Getting Played	Darrel	TV movie
2008	Show Stoppers	Dance Showdown Host	
2013	Deceitful	Mark	
2014	The Next Dance	Mr. Hamilton	Video
2017	The Lurking Man	Emerson	
2017	Caged	Dr. Mock	Short
2018	When It Comes Around	Nate	
2019	Christmas Matchmakers	Owen	TV movie
2021	The Wrong Real Estate Agent	Ron	TV movie
2021	Twice Bitten	Curtis	

=== Television ===
Year	Title	Role	Notes
1991	Baywatch	Man in the Audience	Episode: "Money, Honey"
1991	Full House	Man at Shower	Episode: "Gotta Dance"
1991	Murder, She Wrote	Officer Kimbrough	Episode: "A Killing in Vegas"
1992	Cheers	Teammate #3	Episode: "Take Me Out of the Ball Game"
1995	Sister, Sister	Delivery Man	Episode: "Field Trip"
1995	The Wayans Bros.	Dr. Peters	Episode: "ER"
1995	Hope & Gloria	Dutch	Episode: "Don't Take Any Wooden Elephants"
1995	Beverly Hills, 90210	Guard	Episode: "Home Is Where the Tart Is"
1995	Too Something	Gym Guy	Episode: "Maria Cooks"
1995	Living Single	Mountie Robeson	Episode: "Let It Snow, Let It Snow, Let It Snow... Dammit"
1996	The Steve Harvey Show	Derek	Episode: "High Top Reunion"
1996	Soul Train	Himself/co-host	Episode: "CeCe Peniston/Soul for Real/A+"
1996–1997	Baywatch Nights	Diamont Teague	Main role
1996–1997	Hangin' with Mr. Cooper	Norman	Episode: "Rivals" & "Party, Party"
1997	Lois & Clark: The New Adventures of Superman	Swat Commander	Episode: "I've Got You Under My Skin"
1997	Pacific Blue	Rober Quest	Episode: "Excessive Force"
1998	Prey	Karl Hunter	Episode: "Sleeper"
1998	Moesha	Darnell	Episode: "Birth Control"
1998–2005	Charmed	Darryl Morris	Main role
1999	3rd Rock from the Sun	Byron	Episode: "Alien Hunter"
2002–2003	The Other Half	Himself/co-host	
2003	Girlfriends	Robert	Episode: "Snoop, There It Is"
2003–2006	Soul Train	Himself	Host
2005	The Bad Girl's Guide	Ray	Episode: "The Guide to Doing It Now"
2005	The Bernie Mac Show	-	Episode: "Sorely Missed"
2008	Las Vegas	Agent Miller	Episode: "3 Babes, 100 Guns and a Fat Chick"
2009	Without a Trace	Man	Episode: "Labyrinths"
2015	Trent & Tilly	Donovan Mcnabb	Episode: "Z and the Big TV"
2016	Agents of S.H.I.E.L.D.	Undersecretary Walter Thomas	Episode: "Absolution"
2016	Family Time	Mr. Jenkins	Episode: "The Things We Do for Love"
2023	As Luck Would Have It	Dr. Nolan	Main role
2023	Grey's Anatomy	Kenneth Turner	Episode: "Happily Ever After?"

Preceded by Shemar Moore	Host of Soul Train; 2003–2006	Succeeded by None
