= Brad Kern =

American television producer and writer

- Occupation: Television producer
- Family: Adolf Rosenberger (uncle)

Brad Kern is an American former television producer and writer. He was the executive producer/showrunner of CBS TV procedural NCIS: New Orleans since midway through season two until the end of season four. Previously, he was also executive producer/showrunner on the hit supernatural drama Charmed for all eight seasons.

== Career ==
Kern began in television as a staff writer on Remington Steele where he worked his way up to supervising producer.

He was executive producer/showrunner of the award-winning Fox series New York Undercover. Other previous credits include co-executive producer on Lois & Clark: The New Adventures of Superman, supervising producer on The Adventures of Brisco County, Jr., and executive story editor on Hill Street Blues.

He served as executive producer/showrunner on CW's supernatural Beauty & the Beast for three seasons; and, prior to that, executive producer of the FOX action adventure, Human Target.

=== Charmed ===
Kern was hired as the showrunner when the presentation pilot became a series, and shared the job of executive producer of Charmed with the show's creator Constance M. Burge for the first two seasons. In 2000, Burge left her executive producer position on Charmed ahead of its third season after she reportedly became frustrated with the direction the storylines were going in for that season and because of disagreements with fellow executive producer Kern. However, she remained on Charmed as an executive consultant until the fourth season.

==== Book of Shadows ====
At the end of the series, Kern and Holly Marie Combs, who played Piper Halliwell throughout the series, took duo-ownership of the "Hero" version of the Book of Shadows; the prop versions were sold at auctions. The "Hero" version is the main, most complete Book of Shadows, and was pivotal to shooting the series. It was usually kept under lock and key.

Kern and Combs were supposed to share custody of the book, agreeing to alternate possession with each getting the book for a year. However, it has been revealed that Kern never honored this agreement, having never transferred possession to Combs.

=== NCIS: New Orleans and departure from CBS ===
He was the executive producer/showrunner of CBS TV procedural NCIS: New Orleans since midway through season two until the end of season four. In December 2017, Variety reported that Kern had been investigated by CBS twice for sexual harassment and discrimination against women while show runner of NCIS: New Orleans. In May 2018, Kern departed as NCIS: New Orleans showrunner, though he would remain a consulting producer on the series. Following a third investigation, Kern was fired from the series in October 2018 and his overall deal with CBS Television Studios was terminated.

== Personal life ==
His uncle was Porsche co-founder and race car driver Adolf Rosenberger.
