= Constance M. Burge =

American screenwriter

Constance "Connie" M. Burge (born August 6, 1957) is an American television writer and producer. She is the creator of the television series Charmed (1998–2006) and the short-lived series Savannah (1996–1997). Burge was also a writer for Judging Amy, Ally McBeal and Boston Public, and has produced several other shows. In recent years, she has worked as a consulting producer and writer for Royal Pains (2009–2016), The Fosters (2016–2017) and Instinct (2018).

In 2000, Burge left her executive producer position on Charmed ahead of its third season after she reportedly became frustrated with the direction the storylines were going in for that season and because of disagreements with fellow executive producer Brad Kern. However, she remained on Charmed as an executive consultant until the fourth season.

== Filmography ==
Year(s)	Title	Writer	Producer	Creator	Notes
1995	Medicine Ball	Yes	No	No	Episode: "Heart and Sole"
1996–1997	Savannah	Yes	Yes	Yes	Creator (34 episodes) / Writer (9 episodes) / Supervising producer (12 episodes) / Co-executive producer (22 episodes)
1998–2006	Charmed	Yes	Yes	Yes	Creator (178 episodes) / Writer (7 episodes) / Executive producer (44 episodes) / Executive consultant (44 episodes)
2001–2002	Ally McBeal	Yes	Yes	No	Writer (2 episodes) / Stories (5 episodes) / Consulting producer (22 episodes)
2003	Boston Public	Yes	Yes	No	Writer (3 episodes) / Consulting producer (9 episodes)
2003–2004	Ed	Yes	Yes	No	Writer (3 episodes) / Consulting producer (17 episodes)
2004	CMT Got Me in with the Band	No	Yes	No	Associate producer (Unknown episodes)
2004–2005	Judging Amy	Yes	Yes	No	Writer (2 episodes) / Consulting producer (12 episodes)
2005	Sugar Rush	No	Yes	No	Line producer (Unknown episodes)
2005	Garden Giants: Still Growing	No	Yes	No	Associate producer, Television special
2008	In Plain Sight	Yes	Yes	No	Writer (2 episodes) / Co-executive producer (11 episodes)
2008	The Starter Wife	Yes	Yes	No	Writer (2 episodes) / Co-executive (10 episodes)
2009	Eureka	Story	Yes	No	Story (Episode: "Have an Ice Day") / Consulting producer (6 episodes)
2009–2016	Royal Pains	Yes	Yes	No	Writer (20 episodes) / Consulting producer (28 episodes) / Co-executive producer (15 episodes) / Executive producer (46 episodes)
2010	Cool Tools: The Hardware Show	No	Yes	No	Line producer, Television special
2016–2017	The Fosters	Yes	Yes	No	Writer (2 episodes) / Consulting producer (20 episodes)
2018	Charmed	Story	No	No	Episode: "Pilot"
2018–2019	Instinct	Yes	Yes	No	Writer (4 episodes) / Consulting producer (12 episodes) / Co-executive producer (3 episodes)
2022	Monarch	Yes	Yes	No	Consulting producer (4 episodes)
