= The Boy Who Cried Wolf (disambiguation) =

The Boy Who Cried Wolf is one of Aesop's fables

== Music ==
- "Boy Who Cried Wolf" (song) a 1985 Style Council song
- "The Boy Who Cried Wolf", by Futures from the 2010 album The Holiday
- The Boy Who Cried Wolf (Passenger album), released in 2017
- The Boy Who Cried Wolf (San E album), released in 2015

== Film and TV ==
- 'The Boy Who Cried Wolf', segment of 2007 Chinese short film Crossed Lines (film)
- 'The Boy Who Cried Wolf', TV episode Season 5 Episode 1 Rin Tin Tin: K-9 Cop (1988)
- 'The Boy Who Cried Wolf', TV episode Season 1 Episode 7 Super Why! (2007 TV Series)
- 'The Boy Who Cried Wolf', TV episode Season 1 Episode 4 Chopper One (1974 TV Series)
- 'The Boy Who Cried Wolf', TV episode Season 3 Episode 3 Lassie (1997 TV series)
- 'The Boy Who Cried Wolf', title of episode 10 of Pinocchio (2014 TV series)
- 'The Boy Who Cried Wolf', TV episode Season 1 Episode 8 Between the Lions (1999-2000 TV Series)
- 'The Boy Who Cried Wolf', TV episode Season 1 Episode 4 Shadow of Truth (2016 Israeli TV Mini-Series)
- The Boys Who Cried Wolf 양치기들; RR: Yang-chi-gi-deul) 2015 Korean film

== See also ==
- Boy Cried Wolf
- Cry Wolf (disambiguation)
- The Boy Who Cried Bitch (1991)
- The Boy Who Cried Woof (2007) (TV Episode) Season 3 Episode 16 What's with Andy? (2000) (TV Series)
- The Boy Who Tried Wolf (2002) (TV Episode) Season 3 Episode 14 Big Wolf on Campus (1999) (TV Series)
- The Man Who Cried Wolf (disambiguation)
- The Girl Who Cried Wolf (disambiguation)
- The Boy Who Cried Werewolf (disambiguation)
