= Grimm Fairy Tales (comics) =

Comic book series published by Zenescope Entertainment

- Little Red Riding Hood encounters the wolf in Grimm Fairy Tales #1.

Publication information
- Publisher: Zenescope Entertainment
- Schedule: Monthly
- Publication date: (v1) 2005–2016 (v2) 2017–2025

Creative team
- Written by: Ralph Tedesco; Joe Tyler
- Penciller: Joseph Dodd
- Inker: Justin Holman

Grimm Fairy Tales is a dark fantasy comic book series by Zenescope Entertainment that presents classic fairy tales, albeit with modern twists or expanded plots. It began publication in June 2005.

== Summary ==
Each issue of Grimm Fairy Tales has two parts: a frame story and a fairy tale. The frame story revolves around Dr. Sela Mathers, a professor of literature with the supernatural ability to help people to avoid bad life decisions by subjecting them to visions, in which they see themselves as the protagonists of allegorical fairy tales. As the series progresses, she struggles with the fact that several people ignore her lessons and ruin their lives anyway, and begins using her ability to dispense justice instead. Sela's nemesis is Belinda, who has the same ability as Sela but uses it for evil.

The other portion of the story is a twisted version of a classic fairy tale. The fairy tales are often violent and usually end in depressing ways, warning the readers to change their lives or suffer a similar (or sometimes worse) fate.

It is later revealed that Belinda is working for the Dark One, a Satan-like demon who is seeking to conquer not only Earth but four other worlds which the fairy tales come from. The worlds include Wonderland, Oz, Neverland, and Myst. The series gradually begins to revolve around Sela herself, as she discovers that she has become a major player in an ancient war between the Dark Horde, led by the Dark One and his allies, and the Guardians, leaders of the worlds the Dark One seeks to conquer. Already Wonderland and Neverland have fallen and are now ruled by the Dark One's allies, the monstrous Jabberwocky and the soul-devouring immortal Pan, respectively.

After Volume 15 concluded, a new Zenescope comic event, "The Age of Darkness", began. It spans in every comic related to the Grimm Fairy Tales series. There are major tie-ins and things especially related to major worlds in Grimm Fairy Tales. These worlds are Oz, Myst, Neverland, Wonderland, and Earth. The event happened in 2013–14 heading up to the 100th issue of Grimm Fairy Tales.

After the milestone issue, issues #101–125 are the "Arcane Acres" storyline.

== Core series ==
=== First series ===
Volume	Issue	Title	Release date	Story	Pencils	Inks	Colors
1	#1	Little Red Riding Hood		Joe Tyler and Ralph Tedesco	Joe Dodd	Justin Holman	Lisa Lubera
1	A high school girl is conflicted about her boyfriend, who is frustrated with her reluctance to "go all the way" (i.e., have sex). After he leaves, she finds a book of fairy tales on her bed and falls asleep, dreaming that she is "Red", walking to her grandmother's house through the woods. She arrives to find her grandmother savagely mauled. Jacob, a woodcutter with tender feelings for her, appears and tells her to leave with him immediately. Believing him the killer, Red stabs him with a machete, but is then attacked by the werewolf that killed her grandmother. Before it can attack her, the wounded Jacob kills it with an axe. The wolf transforms back into Red's noble suitor, Samuel, who confesses that he let his carnal desire for her get the better of him. The girl wakes up, resolved to break up with her over-amorous boyfriend. She believes that the story was a dream, but is shocked to see scratches on her face and fallen leaves on her bed.						
1	#2	Cinderella					
1	A bookish young college girl is chased out of a sorority house by the derisive sisters. She wanders into Sela's mythology class, and dreams that she is the protagonist of Cinderella. After her wicked stepmother and stepsisters lock her in the dark cellar as punishment, she is visited by a female demon, who offers her everything she could wish for, in exchange for her soul. Cinderella goes to the Prince's ball and wins his heart, but has to return home before midnight, leaving her glass slipper behind. Hearing that the Prince is searching the land for his true love, Cinderella's family eagerly prepares to receive him, but her stepsisters are attacked by a flock of ravens outside their home. In terror, the stepmother runs inside and locks the door, trapping her daughters outside. She then falls into the cellar, and Cinderella locks her in to starve to death. The next morning, Cinderella meets the Prince, carefully steering his attention away from her stepsisters' desiccated corpses in the back yard, and avoiding inviting him inside the house where he might hear her stepmother's cries for help. Reawakening, the coed tells Sela how much she enjoyed the lecture, and Sela tells her that everything she wants could be hers, "for the right price".						
1	#3	Hansel and Gretel					
1	#4	Rumpelstiltskin					
1	#5	Sleeping Beauty					
1	#6	The Robber Bridegroom					
1	A college girl is outraged to find her boyfriend embracing her sister. The two women begin fighting in a deserted playground, before Sela appears with her book. In an extended dream, two sisters fall in love with the same dashing prince, but after he proposes to the younger sister, the elder lures her to a mountaintop and pushes her off a cliff. The older sister takes her place as the prince's fiancée. On their wedding night, she enters his castle and sits down to dinner, only to see that the "prince" and all his servants are cannibalistic ghouls, who devour her alive, declaring her just as tasty as her sister would have been. Waking up, the sisters reconcile, agreeing that they are family and it would be foolish to let a man come between them.						
2	#7	Snow White					
2	#8	Jack and the Beanstalk					
2	#9	Goldilocks and the Three Bears					
2	#10	The Frog King					
2	#11	Bluebeard					
2	#12	The Pied Piper of Hamelin					

- Issues #13–14: Beauty and the Beast
- Issue #15: The Three Little Pigs
- Issue #16: Little Miss Muffet
- Issue #17: The Juniper Tree
- Issue #18: Three Billy Goats Gruff
- Issue #19: Rapunzel
- Issue #20: The Boy Who Cried Wolf
- Issue #21: The Sorcerer's Apprentice
- Issue #22: The Snow Queen
- Issues #23–24: Snow White and Rose Red
- Issues #25–26: The Little Mermaid
- Issue #27: Three Blind Mice
- Issue #28: The Ugly Duckling
- Issue #29: King Midas
- Issue #30: Rip Van Winkle
- Issues #31–32: Pinocchio
- Issue #33: Three Snake Leaves
- Issue #34: Puss In Boots
- Issue #35: Dorian Gray
- Issue #36: The Ugly Duckling II
- Issue #37: Little Miss Muffet II
- Issue #38: The Lion and the Mouse
- Issue #39: The Scorpion and the Frog
- Issue #40: The Goose and the Golden Egg
- Issue #41: Dante's Inferno [Prelude]
- Issue #42: Baba Yaga
- Issue #43: The Last Unicorn
- Issue #44: The Devil's Brother
- Issue #45: Cinderella [Revisited]
- Issue #46: Godfather Death
- Issue #47: The Devil's Gambit
- Issue #48: The Good Witch
- Issue #49: Myst
- Issue #50: Hard Choices
- Issue #51: The Glass Coffin
- Issue #52: The Golden Stag
- Issue #53: The Fairy and the Dwarf
- Issue #54: The Grateful Beasts
- Issue #55: The Goblin Queen
- Issue #56: Death's Key
- Issue #57: Diamonds and Toads
- Issues #58–62: Mother Nature
- Issue #63: Dream Eater Saga IX [9]
- Issue #64: Dream Eater Saga X [10]
- Issue #65: Jack the Giant Killer
- Issue #66: The Gates of Limbo
- Issue #67: Lost Souls
- Issue #68: The Immortals
- Issue #69: The Arena
- Issue #70: A Drink and a Tale
- Issue #71: The Winter Witch
- Issue #72: Curse of the Winter Witch
- Issue #73: Ghost in the Myst
- Issue #74: Winter's End
- Issue #75: The Return
- Issues #76–81: The Lockdown
- Issue #82: The Seal Skin
- Issues #83–84: Jack Frost
- Issue #85: Unleashed II
- Issues #86–87: The Phoenix
- Issue #88: The Dark Queen
- Issues #89–90: Rapunzel
- Issue #91: Shadow of Doubt
- Issue #92: Breaking Point
- Issue #93: Song of the Sword
- Issue #94: Is it Safe?
- Issue #95: Koschei the Deathless
- Issue #96: Fire and Ice
- Issue #97: The Tooth Fairy
- Issue #98: Leaves of Grass
- Issue #99: The Coming Storm
- Issue #100: Darkness Falls
- Issue #101: New Again
- Issue #102: The Lamp
- Issue #103: Snow White and Rose Red [Revisited]
- Issues #104–105: Rise of the Water Nymphs
- Issue #106: The Prophecy
- Issues #107–108: Burn Your Life Down
- Issues #109–110: Beowulf
- Issue #111: The Mad Hatter
- Issue #112: Bloody Bones
- Issue #113: War Is Over
- Issue #114: Death Breath
- Issue #115: The Sword in the Stone
- Issues #116–117: Something Wicked
- Issue #118: Grimm Furry Tales
- Issue #119: What the Gemini Saw
- Issues #120–121: The Shadow Girl
- Issue #122: Worst Behavior
- Issue #123: Eighteen Forever
- Issue #124: Eighteen Forever [Conclusion]
- Issue #125: Oh, the Places...

=== Second series ===
- Issue #1: A Wolf in Sheep's Clothing
- Issue #2: The Wrath of the Snow Queen
- Issue #3: The Last Genie
- Issue #4: The Princess and the Frog
- Issue #5: Neverland Pixies
- Issue #6: The Piper
- Issue #7: Snow White
- Issue #8: Gargoyles
- Issue #9: Genie of the Shadowlands
- Issue #10 Goldilocks
- Issue #11: Order of Tarot I
- Issue #12: Order of Tarot II
- Issue #13: Age of Camelot
- Issue #14: The Three Musketeers
- Issue #15: The Black Knight
- Issue #16: Sword of Camelot
- Issue #17: Troll Under the Bridge I
- Issue #18: Troll Under the Bridge II
- Issue #19: Knights of the Round Table
- Issue #20: Enter the Zodiac
- Issue #21: Knights of the Round Table II
- Issue #22: Lady of the Lake
- Issue #23: The Fall of Camelot
- Issue #24: Calm Before the Storm
- Issue #25: War of the Grail
- Issue #26: The Odyssey
- Issue #27: Maze Run
- Issue #28: Atlantis
- Issue #29: The Emerald City
- Issue #30: Land of Oz
- Issue #31: Skarabs
- Issue #32: Return to Neverland
- Issue #33: Tribes of Neverland
- Issue #34: War of Neverland
- Issue #35: Wonderland
- Issue #36: Swamp of Madness
- Issue #37: Journey's End
- Issue #38: The Dark Book
- Issue #39: What Lies Within
- Issue #40: Forest of Secrets
- Issue #41: Bearskin
- Issue #42: Baba Yaga Returns!
- Issue #43: A Girl and Her Shadow
- Issue #44: Children of Fortune
- Issue #45: The Handless Maiden
- Issue #46: Mother Hulda
- Issue #47: Nixie of Mill Pond
- Issue #48: An Echo of Wickedness
- Issue #49: False Hero
- Issue #50: A Dark Conclusion
- Issue #51: Fractured Universe
- Issue #52: Cyberpunk'd
- Issue #53: The Spider Beside Her
- Issue #54: Caught in the Web
- Issue #55: Beasts of the City!
- Issue #56: A Pit in the Soul!
- Issue #57: Teeth, Claws and Bullets!
- Issue #58: On Death's Doorstep
- Issue #59: Steam-Powered & Blood Fueled
- Issue #60: Gears Up at Sunrise
- Issue #61: Doom. Spells. Disaster!
- Issue #62: Regicide!
- Issue #63: Waking Horrors
- Issue #64: Deep Secrets!
- Issue #65: The Arcane Terror!
- Issue #66: Lurking Underneath
- Issue #67: Esoteric Beliefs
- Issue #68: The Awakening
- Issue #69: Starspawn
- Issue #70: Haunter of the Dark
- Issue #71: The Dark One
- Issue #72: Doom in the Darkness
- Issue #73: Beyond the Threshold of Dread
- Issue #74: Death on the Doorstep
- Issue #75: Grimm Fairy Tales 75
- Issue #76: Death is Where It Begins
- Issue #77: Life as We Know It
- Issue #78: A Call to Arms
- Issue #79: Through Oblivione
- Issue #80: Congregation of the Dead

== Annuals and specials ==
- 2007 Annuals
  - Grimm Fairy Tales: 2007 Annual
    - Story Time I
    - Jack and Jill
    - The Old Woman in a Shoe
    - Peter Peter Pumpkin Eater
    - Little Boy Blue
    - Pinocchio
    - Story Time II
- 2008 Annuals
  - Grimm Fairy Tales: 2008 Annual
    - The End of the Line
    - Mary Mary Quite Contrary
    - Humpty Dumpty
    - Hush Little Baby
- 2009 Annuals
  - Grimm Fairy Tales: 2009 Giant-Size
    - Fear Not
  - Grimm Fairy Tales: 2009 April Fools' Edition
    - Red Riding Ho
    - Hansel and Gretel II
    - Electric Boogaloo
    - Reeferstiltskin
    - Jack and the Bromance
  - Wonderland: 2009 Annual – The House of Liddle
  - Grimm Fairy Tales: 2009 Halloween Edition
    - The Monkey's Paw
  - Grimm Fairy Tales: 2009 Holiday Edition
    - The Nutcracker
- 2010 Annuals
  - Grimm Fairy Tales: 2010 April Fools' Edition
    - Piper Fluberblunton Goes to Town
    - Drinking Beauty
    - Golddigger and the Beast
    - Snookie White and the Jersey Dwarves
  - Grimm Fairy Tales: 2010 (Las Vegas) Annual
  - Grimm Fairy Tales: 2010 Swimsuit Edition
  - Grimm Fairy Tales: 2010 Halloween Edition
  - Wonderland: 2010 Annual
  - Grimm Fairy Tales: 2010 Holiday Edition
    - Coming to Town
    - Christmas Future
    - The Pollyanna
    - Coming to Town [conclusion]
- 2011 Annuals
  - Wonderland: 2011 Annual
  - Grimm Fairy Tales: 2011 Annual
    - Sinbad Crossover #1
  - Grimm Fairy Tales: 2011 Giant-Size
    - Sinbad Crossover #2
  - Grimm Fairy Tales: 2011 Halloween Edition
    - Dead Luck Desert
    - The Sure Thing
    - Rule of Three
  - Grimm Fairy Tales: 2011 Holiday Edition
    - A Christmas Carol
  - Grimm Fairy Tales: 2011 Special Edition
    - Sinbad Crossover #3
- 2012 Annuals
  - Grimm Fairy Tales 2012 April Fools' Edition
    - The Sorcerer's Cleaning Lady
    - Stalker Mermaid
    - Clarinda's Mom Has Got It Going On
    - Pinocchio: One Creepy-Ass Puppet
  - Grimm Fairy Tales: 2012 Annual
  - Grimm Fairy Tales: 2012 Oversized Cosplay Edition
  - Grimm Fairy Tales: 2012 Swimsuit Edition
  - Wonderland: 2012 Annual
  - Grimm Fairy Tales: 2012 Giant-Size
  - Grimm Fairy Tales: 2012 Halloween Edition
  - Grimm Fairy Tales: 2012 Animated Edition
  - Grimm Fairy Tales: 2012 Holiday Edition
- 2013 Annuals
  - Grimm Fairy Tales: 2013 Valentine's Day Edition
  - Grimm Fairy Tales: 2013 St. Patrick's Day Edition
  - Grimm Fairy Tales: 2013 Wounded Warriors Edition
  - Grimm Fairy Tales: 2013 Giant-Size
  - Grimm Fairy Tales: 2013 Halloween Edition
  - Grimm Fairy Tales: 2013 Holiday Edition
- 2014 Annuals
  - Grimm Fairy Tales: 2014 Annual
  - Grimm Fairy Tales #0: 2014 Free Comic Book Day
  - Grimm Fairy Tales: 2014 Giant-Size
  - Grimm Fairy Tales: 2014 Swimsuit Edition
  - Grimm Fairy Tales: 2014 Halloween Edition
  - Grimm Fairy Tales: 2014 Holiday Edition
- 2015 Annuals
  - Wonderland: 2015 Special Edition [Free Comic Book Day]
  - Grimm Fairy Tales: 2015 Halloween Edition
  - Robyn Hood: 2015 Holiday Edition
  - Realm Knights: 2015 Annual
  - Realm Knights: 2015 Giant-Size
- 2016 Annuals
  - Robyn Hood: 2016 Annual
  - Grimm Fairy Tales: 2016 Swimsuit Edition
  - Grimm Fairy Tales: 2016 Annual
  - Grimm Fairy Tales: 2016 Halloween Edition
  - Grimm Fairy Tales: 2016 Photoshoot Edition
  - Grimm Tales of Terror: 2016 Holiday Edition
  - The Jungle Book: 2016 Holiday Edition
- 2017 Annuals
  - Grimm Tales of Terror: 2017 April Fools' Edition
  - Grimm Fairy Tales: 2017 Swimsuit Edition
  - Grimm Fairy Tales: 2017 Armed Forces Edition
  - Grimm Fairy Tales: 2017 Halloween Edition
  - Grimm Fairy Tales: 2017 Holiday Edition
- 2018 Annuals
  - Grimm Tales of Terror: 2018 Black & White Special Edition
  - Grimm Fairy Tales: 2018 Cosplay Edition
  - Grimm Tales of Terror: 2018 Halloween Edition
  - Grimm Fairy Tales: 2018 Holiday Edition
- 2019 Annuals
  - Grimm Fairy Tales: 2019 Annual
  - Grimm Universe Presents 2019
  - Grimm Fairy Tales: 2019 Giant-Size
  - Grimm Fairy Tales: 2019 Swimsuit Edition
  - Grimm Fairy Tales: 2019 Armed Forces Edition
  - Grimm Universe Presents: Fall 2019
  - Grimm Fairy Tales: 2019 Horror Pinup Special
  - Grimm Tales of Terror: 2019 Halloween Special
  - Grimm Fairy Tales: 2019 Holiday Edition
- 2020 Annuals
  - Grimm Universe Presents 2020
  - Grimm Fairy Tales: 2020 Annual
  - Grimm Tales of Terror Quarterly: 2020 Halloween Special
  - Grimm Fairy Tales: 2020 Holiday Pinup Special
  - Grimm Fairy Tales: 2020 Holiday Special
  - Cinderella Annual: Bloody X-Mas
  - Robyn Hood Annual: World's Apart
  - Van Helsing #50 Anniversary Issue
  - Van Helsing: Annual 2020 Bloodlust
- 2021 Annuals
  - Grimm Fairy Tales: 2021 Swimsuit
  - Neverland Annual
  - Oz Annual: Patchwork Girl
  - Robyn Hood Annual: The Swarm
  - Wonderland Annual: Reign of Madness
  - Grimm Tales of Terror Quarterly: 2021 Halloween Special
  - Grimm Tales of Terror Annual: Goddess of Death
  - Grimm Universe Presents Quarterly: 2021 Holiday Special
- 2022 Annuals
  - Belle Annual #25
  - Van Helsing Annual: Hour of the Witch
  - Oz Annual: Dominion of Ozmo
  - Grimm Fairy Tales 2022 May the 4th Cosplay Special
  - Grimm Fairy Tales: 2022 Swimsuit Special
  - Robyn Hood Annual: Children of Darkness
  - Grimm Fairy Tales: 2022 Annual
  - Grimm Fairy Tales 2022 Horror Pinup Special
  - Grimm Universe Presents Quarterly: 2022 Halloween Special
  - Grimm Fairy Tales 2022 Holiday Pinup Special
  - Belle Annual: Depths of Tartarus
  - Grimm Tales of Terror Quarterly: 2022 Holiday Special
- 2023 Annuals
  - Wonderland Annual: A Wonderful Life
  - Grimm Tales of Terror Quarterly: 2023 Valentine's Special
  - Van Helsing Annual: Sins of the Father
  - Grimm Fairy Tales 2023 May the 4th Cosplay Special
  - Mystere Annual: Spawn of the Abyss
  - Grimm Fairy Tales: 2023 Swimsuit Special
  - Robyn Hood Annual: Invasion
  - Robyn Hood #100
  - Grimm Tales of Terror Quarterly: 2023 Halloween Special
  - Wonderland Annual: Out of Time

== Spin-offs and miniseries ==
Starting in May 2007, a Grimm Fairy Tales spin-off and limited series called Return to Wonderland debuted. Written by Raven Gregory, the series tells the tale of Alice Liddle, the heroine of Alice's Adventures in Wonderland, and her teenage daughter, Calie Liddle (an anagram of "Alice"). Alice is no longer the little girl who fell down the rabbit hole and discovered Wonderland. Now an adult, she once tried to commit suicide by slitting her wrists. Mentally disturbed and in a dreamlike state, her only link to reality is the disturbing white rabbit that she clings to. Calie, not wanting to deal with her mother's mental illness, is now a substance-abusing, alcoholic, promiscuous party girl. The series deals with the entire Liddle family, Alice's childhood, and Calie venturing into a darker and more frightening Wonderland than the one her mother knows. The characters in Return to Wonderland are the Queen of Hearts, the Mad Hatter, the Caterpillar, the Carpenter, the Walrus, Tweedledee, Tweedledum, the Cheshire Cat, the Jabberwocky, the March Hare, and the Cook.

Tales From Wonderland, a three-part prequel to the Return to Wonderland series, was released in 2008, which included The Queen of Hearts, Alice, and The Mad Hatter, followed in June by #0 of Beyond Wonderland, the sequel to Return to Wonderland. The series returned for a third time in the summer of 2009 with another sequel Escape from Wonderland and Tales From Wonderland Series 2, which includes The Cheshire Cat, The Red Queen, Tweedledum and Tweedledee, and The Mad Hatter #2.

Zenescope released a 2009 Annual For Wonderland entitled "The House of Liddle", and continued the story of Calie in Beyond Wonderland, Escape From Wonderland, as well as an annual for 2010, 2011, and 2012. Zenescope began publishing an ongoing Wonderland series in 2012, which revolved around Calie and her teenage daughter Violet. It concluded after issue #50.

Following the success of Wonderland comics, Zenescope started several other series related to the GFT universe. Among them are Neverland, Oz, Robyn Hood and multiple mini-series such as Godstorm, Bad Girls and Sleepy Hollow.

=== Spin-offs ===
==== Grimm Fairy Tales ====
- Myths and Legends [#1 – #25]
- Angel [one-shot]
  - Grimm Universe [#1 – #5]
- Grimm Fairy Tales vs. Wonderland [#1 – #4]
- 10th Anniversary Special [#1 – #6]
  - Snow White
  - Red Riding Hood
  - Alice in Wonderland
  - Death
  - Cinderella
  - Van Helsing

==== Wonderland ====
- Return to Wonderland [#0 – #6]
  - Beyond Wonderland [#0 – #6]
  - Escape From Wonderland [#0 – #6]
- Tales from Wonderland [10 issues]
1. Queen of Hearts
2. The Mad Hatter
3. Alice
4. Cheshire Cat
5. The Red Queen
6. Tweedle Dee and Tweedle Dum
7. The Mad Hatter II
8. The White Knight
9. The Red Rose
10. Queen of Hearts vs. Mad Hatter
- Alice in Wonderland [#1 – #6]
- Call of Wonderland [#1– #4]
- Wonderland [#1 – #50]
  - Wonderland Finale [one-shot]
- The Madness of Wonderland [#1 – #4]
- Wonderland: Down the Rabbit Hole [#1 – #5]
  - Wonderland: Through the Looking Glass [#1 – #5]
  - Wonderland: Asylum [#1 – #5]
- Clash of Queens [#1 – #5]
- Birth of Madness [one-shot]
- Revenge of Wonderland [#1 – #6]

==== Neverland ====
- Neverland [#0 – #7]
- Tales from Neverland [3 issues]
1. Tinker Belle
2. Tiger Lily
3. Croc
- Neverland: Hook [#1 – #5]
- Return of Hook [one-shot]

==== Robyn Hood ====
- Robyn Hood [#1 – #5]
- Robyn Hood vs. Red Riding Hood [one-shot]
- Wanted [#1 – #5]
- Legend [#1 – #5]
- Robyn Hood [#1 – #20]
1. Riot Girls [#1 – #6]
2. Monsters in the Dark [#7 – #12]
3. Attitude Adjustment [#13 – #16]
4. Uprising [#17 – #20]
- I Love NY [#1 – #12] (2016–2017) *TPB*
- Tarot [one-shot] (2017)
- The Hunt [#1 – #6] (2018) *TPB*
- Van Helsing vs. Robyn Hood [1–4] *TPB*
- The Curse [1-6] (2018) *TPB*
- Outlaw [1–6] (2019)
- Justice [1-6] (2020)
- Vigilante [1-6] (2019–2020)
- Iron Maiden [1-2] (2021)
- Cult of the Spider-Queen [one-shot] (2021)
- Voodoo Dawn [one-shot] (2021)
- Goldilocks [one-shot] (2021)
- Night of the Hunter [one-shot] (2021)
- Hellfire [one-shot] (2021)
- Home Sweet Home [one-shot] (2022)
- Shadows of the Past [one-shot] (2022)
- Hearts of Darkness [one-shot] (2022)
- Children of Dr. Moreau [one-shot] (2022)
- Baba Yaga [one-shot] (2022)
- Last Stop [one-shot] (2022)
- Dagon [one-shot] (2023)
- The Crawling Chaos [one-shot] (2023)
- Spawn of Nyarlathotep [one-shot] (2023)
- Dark Shaman [one-shot] (2023)
- Blood in the Water [one-shot] (2024)

==== Oz ====
- Oz [#1 – #6]
- Tales From Oz [6 issues]
1. Tin Man
2. Cowardly Lion
3. Scarecrow
4. Glinda
5. Adraste
6. Zamora
- Warlord of Oz [#1 – #6]
- Reign of the Witch Queen [#1 – #6]
- No Place Like Home [one-shot]
- The Wizard [one-shot]
- Heart of Magic [#1 – #5]
- Oz: Return of the Wicked Witch [#1 – #3]

==== Van Helsing ====
- Helsing [#1 – #4]
- Van Helsing vs. Dracula [#1 – #5]
- Van Helsing vs. Frankenstein [#1 – #5]
- Van Helsing vs. The Mummy of Amun-Ra [#1 – #6]
- Van Helsing vs. The Werewolf [#1 – #6]
- Van Helsing vs. Robyn Hood [#1 – #4]
- Van Helsing: Sword of Heaven [#1 – #6]
- Van Helsing vs. Dracula's Daughter [#1 - #5]
- Van Helsing vs. the League of Monsters [#1 - #6]
- Van Helsing #50 [one-shot]
- Van Helsing: Hellfire [one-shot]
- Van Helsing: Black Annis [one-shot]
- Van Helsing: Steampunk [one-shot]
- Van Helsing: Invisible Woman [one-shot]
- Van Helsing: Beast of Exmoor [one-shot]
- Van Helsing: Return of the League of Monsters [#1 - #2]
- Van Helsing: Shattered Soul [one-shot]
- Van Helsing: Bloodborne [one-shot]
- Van Helsing: From the Depths [one-shot]
- Van Helsing: Flesh of My Blood [one-shot]
- Van Helsing: Rites of Shadows [one-shot]
- Van Helsing: Deadly Alchemy [one-shot]
- Van Helsing: Finding Neverland [one-shot]
- Van Helsing: Hell to Pay [one-shot]
- Van Helsing: The Horror Beneath [one-shot]
- Van Helsing: The Syndicate [one-shot]

==== Belle ====
- Belle: Beast Hunter [#1 - #6]
- Belle: Oath of Thorns [#1 -#6]
- Belle vs. The Black Knight [one-shot]
- Belle: Ghosts & Goblins [one-shot]
- Belle: Hearts & Minds [one-shot]
- Belle: Horns of the Minotaur [one-shot]
- Belle: Targeted Prey [one-shot]
- Belle: Dead of Winter [one-shot]
- Belle: Thunder of Gods [one-shot]
- Belle: King of Serpents [one-shot]
- Belle: Sirens [one-shot]
- Belle: Dragon Clan [one-shot]
- Belle: Headless Horseman [one-shot]
- Belle: Kill Zone [one-shot]
- Belle: Queen of Serpents [one-shot]
- Belle: War of the Giants [one-shot]
- Belle: Labyrinth [one-shot]
- Belle: Return of Scylla [one-shot]
- Belle: Hunt of the Centaurs [one-shot]
- Belle: Deep Freeze [one-shot]
- Belle: Scream of the Banshee [one-shot]
- Belle: From Beyond [one-shot]
- Belle: The Shape of Fear [one-shot]
- Belle: Ancient Instincts [one-shot]
- Belle: Cursed [one-shot]
- Belle: Housse of Glass Slippers [one-shot]

=== Miniseries ===
- The Piper [#1 – #4]
- Inferno [#1 – #5]
- Inferno: Resurrection [#1 – #5]
- The Library [#1 – #5]
- The Jungle Book [#1 – #5]
- The Jungle Book: Last of the Species [#1 – #5]
- The Jungle Book: Fall of the Wild [#1 – #5]
- Bad Girls [#1 – #5]
- Godstorm [#0 – #4]
- Godstorm: Hercules Payne [#1 – #5]
- Sleepy Hollow [#1 – #4]
- No Tomorrow [#1 – #5]
- Goddess Inc. [#1 – #5]
- Masumi: Blades of Sin [#1 – #4]
- Dark Shaman [#1 – #4]
- The Little Mermaid [#1 – #5]
- Coven [#1 – #5]
- Steampunk [#1 – #2]
- Steampunk: Alice In Wonderland [one-shot]
- Red Riding Hood: Red Agent [#1 – #5]
- Red Agent: The Human Order [#1 – #9]
- Red Agent: Island of Dr. Moreau [#1 - #5]
- Hellchild [#1 – #5]
- Hellchild: The Unholy [#1 – #5]
- Hellchild: Inferno [one-shot]
- Hellchild: Blood Money [#1 – #4]
- Snow White vs. Snow White [#1 – #2]
- Grimm Fairy Tales: Apocalypse [#1 – #5]
- Genesis: Heroes Reborn [5 stories]
- Van Helsing: Timeless Classic [one-shot]
- Robyn Hood: Auld Lang Syne [one-shot]
- Wonderland: Mad Dreams [one-shot]
- Death Force: Totems [one-shot]
- Grimm Fairy Tales: Judgment Rising [one-shot]
- Genesis: Heroes Rising [5 stories]
- Red Agent: The Mission [one-shot]
- A Day of the Dead Tale [one-shot]
- Hellchild: Blood Money [one-shot]
- Oz: Birth of a Warlord [one-shot]
- Death [one-shot]
- Death Force [#1 - #6]
- Zodiac [#1 - #3]
- Mystere [#1 - #5]
- Day of the Dead [#1 – #6]
- Dance of The Dead [#1 – #6]
- Grimm Fairy Tales: Tarot [#1 – #6]
- The Musketeers [#1 – #5]
- Jasmine: Crown of Kings [#1 – #5]
- The Black Knight [#1 – #5]
- Gretel [#1 - #5]
- Dragonsblood [#1 - #4]
- Cinderella Serial Killer Princess [#1 - #4]

=== Grimm Spotlight ===
- The Black Knight vs. Lord of the Flies
- Mystere - Voodoo Dawn
- Hercules Payne vs. the Scorpion Queen
- Red Agent: Beast of Belgium
- Cinderella vs. Zombies
- Hellchild
- Gretel: Bloody Mary
- Mystere - Divinity
- Zodiac
- Iron Maiden
- Cinderella vs. The Tooth Fairy
- Red Agent: Friendly Fire
- Inferno - The Soul Collector
- Masumi
- Lovecraft's Legacy
- Zodiac vs Hydra

=== Myths and Legends ===
- Ares
- Gretel Witch Hunter
- Dark Princess
- Dragon Clan
- Blood Pharaoh
- Prophecy
- Jack and Jill
- Jasmine
- Wonderland - War of Madness
- Blood of the Gods
- Black Knight - Fate of Legends
- Dagon

=== Grimm Universe ===
- Darkwatchers: Gretel
- Steampunk
- Zodiac vs Death Force
- The Black Knight
- Dracula's Daughter
- Sleeping Beauty
- Cinderella - Fairy World Massacre

=== Crossover ===
The Dream Eater Saga [12 issues]

- 0. Prologue
- 1. Once Upon a Time
- 2. The Piper [one-shot]
- 3. Myths and Legends #6
- 4. Wonderland [one-shot]
- 5. Neverland [one-shot]
- 6. Salem's Daughter [one-shot]
- 7. Myths and Legends #7
- 8. Sinbad [one-shot]
- 9. Grimm Fairy Tales #63
- 10. Grimm Fairy Tales #64
- 11. Inferno [one-shot]
- 12. Ever After [conclusion]

Unleashed [6 issues]

- 0. The Game
- 1. Day Breaks
- 2. Grimm Fairy Tales #85
- 3. Grimm Fairy Tales: 2013 Annual
- 4. Grimm Universe #5
- 5. Grimm Fairy Tales: 2013 Special Edition
- 6. Grimm Fairy Tales: 2013 Giant-Size

Unleashed [miniseries]:

- Vampires: The Eternal [#1 – #3]
- Hunters: The Shadowlands [#1 – #5]
- Werewolves: The Hunger [#1 – #3]
- Demons: The Unseen [#1 – #3]
- Zombies: The Cursed [#1 – #4]

Age of Darkness [multiple issues]

- Realm Knights [one-shot]
  - Realm Knights [#1 – #4]
- Ascension [#1 – #5]
- Code Red [#1 – #5]
- Quest [#1 – #5]
- The Dark Queen: Age of Darkness [one-shot]
- Grimm Fairy Tales #94 – #100
- Robyn Hood: Age of Darkness [one-shot]
- Neverland: Age of Darkness [#1 – #4]
- Inferno: Age of Darkness [one-shot]
  - Rings of Hell [#1 – #3]
- The Dark One: Age of Darkness [one-shot]
- Oz: Age of Darkness [one-shot]
- Wonderland: Age of Darkness [one-shot]
- Godstorm: Age of Darkness [one-shot]
- Realm War: Age of Darkness [#1 – #12]
- Realm Knights: Age of Darkness [one-shot]
- Cinderella: Age of Darkness [#1 – #3]

=== Other series ===
- 1001 Arabian Nights: The Adventures of Sinbad [#0 – #13]
- Salem's Daughter [#0 – #5]
- Salem's Daughter: The Haunting [#1 – #5]
- Grimm Tales of Terror [#1 – #13]
- Grimm Tales of Terror, Vol. 2 [#1 – #13]
- Grimm Tales of Terror, Vol. 3 [#1 – #13]
- Grimm Tales of Terror, Vol. 4 [#1 – #13]
- Grimm Tales of Terror: The Bridgewater Triangle [#1 - #3]

== Collections and trade paperbacks ==
The contents of a Grimm Fairy Tales comic collection can be defined into three categories: there are those issues that are "officially" reprinted in the collection (these issues have their original covers included in the cover gallery section), there are (parts of) issues from another series (these are included to induce the reader to buy that series), and there are bonus stories (original stories that were made specifically for the collection).

=== Grimm Fairy Tales V1 (Sela) (2005-2016) ===
Title	Material collected	Publication date
Grimm Fairy Tales, Vol. 1	#1–6	July 2006
Grimm Fairy Tales, Vol. 2	#7–12	October 2007
Grimm Fairy Tales, Vol. 3	#13–18	May 2008
Grimm Fairy Tales, Vol. 4	#19–24	October 2008
Grimm Fairy Tales, Vol. 5	#25–30	March 2009
Grimm Fairy Tales, Vol. 6	#31–36	June 2009
Grimm Fairy Tales, Vol. 7	#37–42	February 2010
Grimm Fairy Tales, Vol. 8	#43–50	October 2010
Grimm Fairy Tales, Vol. 9	#51–56	April 2011
Grimm Fairy Tales, Vol. 10	#57–62	September 2011
Grimm Fairy Tales, Vol. 11	#65–70	May 2012
Grimm Fairy Tales, Vol. 12	#71–75	September 2012
Grimm Fairy Tales, Vol. 13	#76–81	February 2013
Grimm Fairy Tales, Vol. 14	#82–84, #86–87	October 2013
Grimm Fairy Tales, Vol. 15	#89–93	March 2014
Arcane Acre
Arcane Acre, Vol. 1	#101–106	April 2015
Arcane Acre, Vol. 2	#107–112	April 2016
Arcane Acre, Vol. 3	#113–118	October 2016
Arcane Acre, Vol. 4	#119–125	March 2017
Omnibus releases
Grimm Fairy Tales Omnibus Vol. 1	#1–24	May 2012
Grimm Fairy Tales Omnibus Vol. 2	#25-50	August 2012
Grimm Fairy Tales Omnibus Vol. 3	#51–75	July 2013
Arcane Acre Omnibus	#101–125	February 2020

=== Grimm Fairy Tales V2 (Skye) (2016-) ===
Title	Material collected	Publication date
Grimm Fairy Tales: Legacy	#1–12	May 2018
Grimm Fairy Tales: Age of Camelot	#13–25; Annual 2019; Giant Size 2019	August 2019
Grimm Fairy Tales: Odyssey	#26–37; Annual 2020	June 2022

=== Wonderland ===
Title	Material collected	Publication date
GFTP - Return to Wonderland	#0-6	October 2008
GFTP - Beyond Wonderland	#0-7	September 2010
GFTP - Escape From Wonderland	#0-6	May 2011
GFTP - Wonderland - The House of Liddle	Wonderland Annual 2009; Wonderland Annual 2010; Wonderland Annual 2011	September 2011
GFTP - Alice In Wonderland	#1-6	September 2013
GFTP - Call of Wonderland	#1-4	September 2013
GFTP - Madness of Wonderland	#1-4	November 2013
GFTP – Wonderland: Asylum	#1-5	October 2014
GFTP – Wonderland: Clash of Queens	#1-5	October 2014
GFTP – Wonderland: Through the Looking Glass	#1-5	April 2014
Grimm Fairy Tales vs. Wonderland	#1-4	April 2015
GFTP - Revenge of Wonderland	#1-5	April 2019
Tales From Wonderland
Tales From Wonderland Vol. 1	Tales from Wonderland: Queen of Hearts; Tales from Wonderland: The Mad Hatter; Tales from Wonderland: Alice	August 2009
Tales From Wonderland Vol. 2	Tales from Wonderland: The Cheshire Cat; Tales from Wonderland: The Red Queen; Tales from Wonderland: Tweedle Dee and Tweedle Dum; Tales from Wonderland: The Mad Hatter II	December 2009
Tales From Wonderland Vol. 3	Tales from Wonderland: The White Knight; Tales from Wonderland: The Red Rose; Tales from Wonderland: Queen of Hearts vs. Mad Hatter	December 2010
Grimm Fairy Tales Presents Wonderland
GFTP - Wonderland v01	#1-5	October 2013
GFTP - Wonderland v02	#6-10	November 2013
GFTP - Wonderland v03	#11-15	December 2013
GFTP - Wonderland v04	#16-20	September 2014
GFTP - Wonderland v05	#21-25	April 2015
GFTP - Wonderland v06	#26-30	November 2015
GFTP - Wonderland v07	#31-36	March 2016
GFTP - Wonderland v08	#37-41 Wonderland FCBD Issue 2015	March 2016
GFTP - Wonderland v09	#42-46	December 2016
GFTP - Wonderland v10	#47-50 Wonderland Finale	March 2017
Uncollected
Wonderland Annual 2012		July 2012
Wonderland: Birth of Madness (one-shot)		May 2017

=== Robyn Hood ===
Title	Material collected	Publication date
V1 (2012)
Robyn Hood Vol. 1: Origin	Robyn Hood (2012) issues #1-5	October 2013
Robyn Hood Vol. 2: Wanted	#1-5	February 2014
Robyn Hood Vol. 3: Legend	#1-5	February 2015
V2 (2014–2016)
Robyn Hood V4 Vol. 1: Riot Girls	Robyn Hood (2014) issues #1-6	March 2015
Robyn Hood V4 Vol. 2: Monsters In The Dark	Robyn Hood (2014) issues #7-12	September 2015
Robyn Hood V4 Vol. 3: Attitude Adjustment	Robyn Hood (2014) issues #13-16; Robyn Hood 2015 Holiday Special	January 2016
Robyn Hood V4 Vol. 4: Uprising	Robyn Hood (2014) issues #17-20; Robyn Hood 2016 Annual	November 2016

Title	Material collected	Publication date
Robyn Hood - I Love NY	#1-12	February 2018
Robyn Hood - Outlaw	#1-6	March 2020
Robyn Hood - The Curse	#1-6	December 2018
Robyn Hood - The Hunt	#1-6	June 2018
Robyn Hood - Vigilante	#1-6	January 2021

== Chronological order ==
=== 2005 ===
- 2005/06 – Grimm Fairy Tales #1
- 2005/11 – Grimm Fairy Tales #2
- 2005/12 – Grimm Fairy Tales #3

=== 2006 ===
- 2006/01 – Grimm Fairy Tales #4
- 2006/03 – Grimm Fairy Tales #5
- 2006/05 – Grimm Fairy Tales #6
- 2006/06 – Grimm Fairy Tales #7
- 2006/07 – Grimm Fairy Tales #8
- 2006/08 – Grimm Fairy Tales #9
- 2006/09 – Grimm Fairy Tales #10
- 2006/10 – Grimm Fairy Tales #11

=== 2007 ===
- 2007/02 – Grimm Fairy Tales #12
- 2007/02 – Grimm Fairy Tales #13
- 2007/04 – Grimm Fairy Tales #14
- 2007/05 – Return to Wonderland #0 of 6
- 2007/06 – Grimm Fairy Tales #15
- 2007/07 – Return to Wonderland #1 of 6
- 2007/07 – Return to Wonderland #2 of 6
- 2007/07 – Grimm Fairy Tales #16
- 2007/09 – Return to Wonderland #3 of 6
- 2007/10 – Grimm Fairy Tales #17
- 2007/10 – Grimm Fairy Tales: 2007 Annual
- 2007/10 – Return to Wonderland #4 of 6
- 2007/11 – Grimm Fairy Tales #18
- 2007/11 – Grimm Fairy Tales #19
- 2007/12 – Grimm Fairy Tales #20
- 2007/12 – Return to Wonderland #5 of 6

=== 2008 ===
- 2008/01 – Grimm Fairy Tales #21
- 2008/02 – Grimm Fairy Tales #22
- 2008/02 – Return to Wonderland #6 of 6
- 2008/03 – The Piper #1 of 4
- 2008/03 – Grimm Fairy Tales #23
- 2008/03 – Grimm Fairy Tales #24
- 2008/04 – The Piper #2 of 4
- 2008/04 – 1001 Arabian Nights: The Adventures of Sinbad #0
- 2008/04 – Grimm Fairy Tales #25
- 2008/04 – Grimm Fairy Tales #26
- 2008/04 – Tales from Wonderland: Queen of Hearts
- 2008/05 – 1001 Arabian Nights: The Adventures of Sinbad #1
- 2008/05 – Beyond Wonderland #0 of 6
- 2008/05 – Grimm Fairy Tales #27
- 2008/05 – Tales from Wonderland: The Mad Hatter
- 2008/06 – The Piper #3 of 4
- 2008/06 – Grimm Fairy Tales #28
- 2008/06 – Tales from Wonderland: Alice
- 2008/07 – Beyond Wonderland #1 of 6
- 2008/07 – The Piper #4 of 4
- 2008/07 – Grimm Fairy Tales #29
- 2008/07 – 1001 Arabian Nights: The Adventures of Sinbad #2
- 2008/08 – Grimm Fairy Tales #30
- 2008/08 – 1001 Arabian Nights: The Adventures of Sinbad #3
- 2008/09 – Beyond Wonderland #2 of 6
- 2008/10 – Beyond Wonderland #3 of 6
- 2008/10 – Grimm Fairy Tales #31
- 2008/11 – 1001 Arabian Nights: The Adventures of Sinbad #4
- 2008/11 – Grimm Fairy Tales #32
- 2008/11 – 1001 Arabian Nights: The Adventures of Sinbad #5
- 2008/12 – Grimm Fairy Tales #33
- 2008/12 – 1001 Arabian Nights: The Adventures of Sinbad #6
- 2008/12 – Grimm Fairy Tales: 2008 Annual

=== 2009 ===
- 2009/01 – 1001 Arabian Nights: The Adventures of Sinbad #7
- 2009/01 – Grimm Fairy Tales #34
- 2009/01 – Grimm Fairy Tales: 2009 Giant-Size
- 2009/01 – 1001 Arabian Nights: The Adventures of Sinbad #8
- 2009/02 – Beyond Wonderland #4 of 6
- 2009/02 – Grimm Fairy Tales #35
- 2009/02 – Grimm Fairy Tales #36
- 2009/03 – Beyond Wonderland #5 of 6
- 2009/04 – 1001 Arabian Nights: The Adventures of Sinbad #9
- 2009/04 – Beyond Wonderland #6 of 6
- 2009/04 – Grimm Fairy Tales #37
- 2009/04 – Grimm Fairy Tales: 2009 April Fool's Edition
- 2009/04 – Salem's Daughter #0 of 5
- 2009/05 – Grimm Fairy Tales #38
- 2009/05 – Wonderland: 2009 Annual – The House of Liddle
- 2009/06 – Escape From Wonderland #0 of 6
- 2009/06 – Grimm Fairy Tales #39
- 2009/06 – Tales from Wonderland: The Cheshire Cat
- 2009/06 – Salem's Daughter #1 of 5
- 2009/06 – Tales from Wonderland: The Red Queen
- 2009/07 – Escape From Wonderland #1 of 6
- 2009/07 – Grimm Fairy Tales #40
- 2009/08 – Grimm Fairy Tales #41
- 2009/09 – Tales from Wonderland: Tweedle Dee and Tweedle Dum
- 2009/10 – Salem's Daughter #2 of 5
- 2009/10 – Escape From Wonderland #2 of 6
- 2009/10 – Grimm Fairy Tales #42
- 2009/10 – Grimm Fairy Tales: 2009 Halloween Special
- 2009/10 – Tales from Wonderland: The Mad Hatter II
- 2009/10 – 1001 Arabian Nights: The Adventures of Sinbad #10
- 2009/12 – Escape From Wonderland #3 of 6
- 2009/12 – Grimm Fairy Tales #43
- 2009/12 – Grimm Fairy Tales: 2009 Holiday Edition

=== 2010 ===
- 2010/01 – Escape From Wonderland #4 of 6
- 2010/01 – Neverland #0 of 7
- 2010/02 – Grimm Fairy Tales #44
- 2010/02 – Salem's Daughter #3 of 5
- 2010/03 – Escape From Wonderland #5 of 6
- 2010/03 – Grimm Fairy Tales #45
- 2010/03 – Neverland #1 of 7
- 2010/04 – Escape From Wonderland #6 of 6
- 2010/04 – Grimm Fairy Tales #46
- 2010/04 – Salem's Daughter #4 of 5
- 2010/04 – Grimm Fairy Tales: 2010 April Fool's Edition
- 2010/04 – Neverland #2 of 7
- 2010/05 – Inferno #1 of 5
- 2010/05 – Grimm Fairy Tales: 2010 (Las Vegas) Annual
- 2010/05 – Grimm Fairy Tales #47
- 2010/05 – Tales from Wonderland: The White Knight
- 2010/06 – Grimm Fairy Tales #48
- 2010/06 – Neverland #3 of 7
- 2010/07 – Inferno #2 of 5
- 2010/07 – Grimm Fairy Tales: 2010 Swimsuit Special
- 2010/07 – Grimm Fairy Tales #49
- 2010/07 – 1001 Arabian Nights: The Adventures of Sinbad #11
- 2010/07 – Neverland #4 of 7
- 2010/07 – Tales from Wonderland: The Red Rose
- 2010/08 – Inferno #3 of 5
- 2010/08 – 1001 Arabian Nights: The Adventures of Sinbad #12
- 2010/08 – Salem's Daughter #5 of 5
- 2010/08 – Tales from Wonderland: Queen of Hearts vs. Mad Hatter
- 2010/09 – Grimm Fairy Tales #50
- 2010/09 – Grimm Fairy Tales #51
- 2010/09 – Inferno #4 of 5
- 2010/09 – Neverland #5 of 7
- 2010/10 – Grimm Fairy Tales #52
- 2010/10 – Grimm Fairy Tales: 2010 Halloween Special
- 2010/10 – 1001 Arabian Nights: The Adventures of Sinbad #13
- 2010/11 – Grimm Fairy Tales #53
- 2010/11 – Wonderland: 2010 Annual
- 2010/12 – Inferno #5 of 5
- 2010/12 – Grimm Fairy Tales #54
- 2010/12 – Grimm Fairy Tales: 2010 Holiday Edition
- 2010/12 – Neverland #6 of 7

=== 2011 ===
- 2011/01 – Myths & Legends #1
- 2011/02 – Grimm Fairy Tales #55
- 2011/02 – Neverland #7 of 7
- 2011/03 – Grimm Fairy Tales #56
- 2011/03 – Grimm Fairy Tales #57
- 2011/03 – Myths & Legends #2
- 2011/03 – Myths & Legends #3
- 2011/04 – Grimm Fairy Tales #58
- 2011/04 – Myths & Legends #4
- 2011/04 – The Dream Eater Saga: Prelude ("The Dream Eater Saga" #0 of 12)
- 2011/05 – Tales from Neverland: Tinker Belle
- 2011/05 – Grimm Fairy Tales #59
- 2011/05 – The Dream Eater Saga: Once Upon a Time ("The Dream Eater Saga" #1 of 12)
- 2011/06 – Grimm Fairy Tales #60
- 2011/06 – Wonderland: 2011 Annual
- 2011/06 – Myths & Legends #5
- 2011/06 – The Dream Eater Saga: The Piper ("The Dream Eater Saga" #2 of 12)
- 2011/06 – Myths & Legends #6: ("The Dream Eater Saga" #3 of 12)
- 2011/06 – The Dream Eater Saga: Wonderland ("The Dream Eater Saga" #4 of 12)
- 2011/06 – The Dream Eater Saga: Neverland ("The Dream Eater Saga" #5 of 12)
- 2011/07 – Tales from Neverland: Tiger Lily
- 2011/07 – Grimm Fairy Tales #61
- 2011/07 – Grimm Fairy Tales #62
- 2011/07 – The Dream Eater Saga: Salem's Daughter ("The Dream Eater Saga" #6 of 12)
- 2011/07 – Myths & Legends #7 ("The Dream Eater Saga" #7 of 12)
- 2011/08 – Tales from Neverland: Croc
- 2011/08 – The Dream Eater Saga: Sinbad ("The Dream Eater Saga" #8 of 12)
- 2011/08 – Salem's Daughter: The Haunting #1 of 5
- 2011/08 – Grimm Fairy Tales #63 ("The Dream Eater Saga" #9 of 12)
- 2011/09 – The Library #1 of 5
- 2011/09 – Grimm Fairy Tales #64 ("The Dream Eater Saga" #10 of 12)
- 2011/09 – Grimm Fairy Tales': 2011 Annual ("Sinbad Crossover" #1 of 3)
- 2011/09 – Salem's Daughter: The Haunting #2 of 5
- 2011/09 – The Dream Eater Saga: Inferno ("The Dream Eater Saga" #11 of 12)
- 2011/10 – The Library #2 of 5
- 2011/10 – Grimm Fairy Tales: 2011 Giant-Size ("Sinbad Crossover" #2 of 3)
- 2011/10 – Grimm Fairy Tales: 2011 Halloween Special
- 2011/10 – Myths & Legends #8
- 2011/10 – The Dream Eater Saga: Ever After ("The Dream Eater Saga" #12 of 12)
- 2011/11 – Grimm Fairy Tales #65
- 2011/11 – Myths & Legends #9
- 2011/11 – Neverland: Hook #1 of 5
- 2011/11 – Salem's Daughter: The Haunting #3 of 5
- 2011/11 – Neverland: Hook #2 of 5
- 2011/12 – The Library #3 of 5
- 2011/12 – Grimm Fairy Tales #66
- 2011/12 – Grimm Fairy Tales: 2011 Holiday Edition
- 2011/12 – Salem's Daughter: The Haunting #4 of 5
- 2011/12 – Grimm Fairy Tales: 2011 Special Edition ("Sinbad Crossover" #3 of 3)
- 2011/12 – Myths & Legends #10

=== 2012 ===
- 2012/01 – Alice in Wonderland #1 of 6
- 2012/01 – Myths & Legends #11
- 2012/02 – Alice in Wonderland #2 of 6
- 2012/02 – The Library #4 of 5
- 2012/02 – Grimm Fairy Tales #67
- 2012/02 – Myths & Legends #12
- 2012/02 – Myths & Legends #13
- 2012/02 – Neverland: Hook #3 of 5
- 2012/03 – Alice in Wonderland #3 of 6
- 2012/03 – Grimm Fairy Tales #68
- 2012/03 – Salem's Daughter: The Haunting #5 of 5
- 2012/03 – Grimm Fairy Tales #69
- 2012/03 – Grimm Fairy Tales #70
- 2012/03 – Myths & Legends #14
- 2012/03 – Neverland: Hook #4 of 5
- 2012/03 – The Jungle Book #1 of 5
- 2012/04 – Alice in Wonderland #4 of 6
- 2012/04 – Alice in Wonderland #5 of 6
- 2012/04 – The Library #5 of 5
- 2012/04 – Grimm Fairy Tales #71
- 2012/04 – Grimm Fairy Tales #72
- 2012/04 – Grimm Fairy Tales: 2012 April Fool's Edition
- 2012/04 – Myths & Legends #15
- 2012/04 – The Jungle Book #2 of 5
- 2012/05 – Alice in Wonderland #6 of 6
- 2012/05 – Call of Wonderland #1 of 4
- 2012/05 – Grimm Fairy Tales #73
- 2012/05 – Myths & Legends #16
- 2012/05 – Myths & Legends #17
- 2012/05 – Neverland: Hook #5 of 5
- 2012/05 – The Jungle Book #3 of 5
- 2012/06 – Grimm Fairy Tales: Angel
- 2012/06 – Grimm Fairy Tales #74
- 2012/06 – Grimm Fairy Tales: 2012 Annual
- 2012/06 – Grimm Fairy Tales: Oversized Cosplay Special
- 2012/07 – Call of Wonderland #2 of 4
- 2012/07 – Bad Girls #1 of 5
- 2012/07 – Grimm Fairy Tales #75
- 2012/07 – Grimm Fairy Tales: 2012 Swimsuit Special
- 2012/07 – The Jungle Book #4 of 5
- 2012/07 – Myths & Legends #18
- 2012/07 – Wonderland: 2012 Annual
- 2012/07 – Wonderland #1
- 2012/08 – Call of Wonderland #3 of 4
- 2012/08 – Myths & Legends #19
- 2012/09 – Bad Girls #2 of 5
- 2012/09 – Call of Wonderland #4 of 4
- 2012/09 – Godstorm #0 of 4
- 2012/09 – Grimm Fairy Tales #76
- 2012/09 – Grimm Fairy Tales #77
- 2012/09 – The Jungle Book #5 of 5
- 2012/09 – Myths & Legends #20
- 2012/09 – Wonderland #2
- 2012/09 – Wonderland #3
- 2012/10 – Bad Girls #3 of 5
- 2012/10 – Godstorm #1 of 4
- 2012/10 – Grimm Fairy Tales #78
- 2012/10 – Grimm Fairy Tales: 2012 Giant-Size
- 2012/10 – Grimm Fairy Tales: 2012 Halloween Special
- 2012/10 – Grimm Universe #1 of 5
- 2012/10 – Myths & Legends #21
- 2012/10 – Myths & Legends #22
- 2012/10 – Robyn Hood #1 of 5
- 2012/10 – Robyn Hood #2 of 5
- 2012/10 – Sleepy Hollow #1 of 4
- 2012/10 – Wonderland #4
- 2012/11 – Bad Girls #4 of 5
- 2012/11 – Godstorm #2 of 4
- 2012/11 – Grimm Fairy Tales #79
- 2012/11 – Myths & Legends #23
- 2012/11 – Robyn Hood #3 of 5
- 2012/11 – Sleepy Hollow #2 of 4
- 2012/11 – Wonderland #5
- 2012/12 – Bad Girls #5 of 5
- 2012/12 – Godstorm #3 of 4
- 2012/12 – Grimm Fairy Tales #80
- 2012/12 – Grimm Fairy Tales: 2012 Holiday Edition
- 2012/12 – Robyn Hood #4 of 5
- 2012/12 – Wonderland #6

=== 2013 ===
- 2013/01 – Grimm Fairy Tales #81
- 2013/01 – Grimm Universe #2 of 5
- 2013/01 – Myths & Legends #24
- 2013/01 – Sleepy Hollow #3 of 4
- 2013/01 – Sleepy Hollow #4 of 4
- 2013/01 – Wonderland #7
- 2013/02 – Godstorm #4 of 4
- 2013/02 – Grimm Fairy Tales #82
- 2013/02 – Grimm Fairy Tales: 2013 Valentine's Day Special
- 2013/02 – Grimm Universe #3 of 5
- 2013/02 – Myths & Legends #25
- 2013/02 – Robyn Hood #5 of 5
- 2013/02 – Wonderland #8
- 2013/02 – The Madness of Wonderland #1 of 4
- 2013/02 – The Jungle Book: Last of the Species #1 of 5
- 2013/03 – Robyn Hood vs. Red Riding Hood
- 2013/03 – Grimm Fairy Tales #83
- 2013/03 – The Jungle Book: Last of the Species #2 of 5
- 2013/03 – The Madness of Wonderland #2 of 4
- 2013/03 – Grimm Universe #4 of 5
- 2103/03 – Grimm Fairy Tales: 2013 St. Patrick's Day Special
- 2013/03 – Wonderland #9
- 2013/04 – Unleashed: The Game ("Unleashed" #0 of 6)
- 2013/04 – Unleashed: Day Breaks ("Unleashed" #1 of 6)
- 2013/04 – Wonderland #10
- 2013/04 – The Madness of Wonderland #3 of 4
- 2013/04 – Grimm Fairy Tales #84
- 2013/04 – Vampires: The Eternal #1 of 3 ("Unleashed" tie-in)
- 2013/04 – The Jungle Book: Last of the Species #3 of 5
- 2013/05 – Hunters: The Shadowlands #1 of 5 ("Unleashed" tie-in)
- 2013/05 – Robyn Hood: Wanted #1 of 5
- 2013/05 – Vampires: The Eternal #2 of 3 ("Unleashed" tie-in)
- 2013/05 – The Madness of Wonderland #4 of 4
- 2013/05 – Wonderland: Down the Rabbit Hole #1 of 5
- 2013/05 – Werewolves: The Hunger #1 of 3 ("Unleashed" tie-in)
- 2013/05 – Grimm Fairy Tales #85 ("Unleashed" #2 of 6)
- 2013/05 – Wonderland #11
- 2013/05 – Realm Knights
- 2013/06 – Robyn Hood: Wanted #2 of 5
- 2013/06 – Wonderland: Down the Rabbit Hole #2 of 5
- 2013/06 – Demons: The Unseen #1 of 3 ("Unleashed" tie-in)
- 2013/06 – The Jungle Book: Last of the Species #4 of 5
- 2013/06 – Grimm Fairy Tales #86
- 2013/06 – Vampires: The Eternal #3 of 3 ("Unleashed" tie-in)
- 2013/06 – Grimm Fairy Tales: 2013 Annual ("Unleashed" #3 of 6)
- 2013/06 – Hunters: The Shadowlands #2 of 5 ("Unleashed" tie-in)
- 2013/06 – Wonderland #12
- 2013/07 – Oz #1 of 6
- 2013/07 – Grimm Universe #5 of 5: ("Unleashed" #4 of 6)
- 2013/07 – Grimm Fairy Tales #87
- 2013/07 – Grimm Fairy Tales: Wounded Warriors Special
- 2013/07 – Zombies: The Cursed #1 of 3 ("Unleashed" tie-in)
- 2013/07 – Demons: The Unseen #2 of 3 ("Unleashed" tie-in)
- 2013/07 – The Jungle Book: Last of the Species #5 of 5
- 2013/07 – Hunters: The Shadowlands #3 of 5 ("Unleashed" tie-in)
- 2013/07 – Robyn Hood: Wanted #3 of 5
- 2013/07 – Werewolves: The Hunger #2 of 3 ("Unleashed" tie-in)
- 2013/08 – Wonderland: Down the Rabbit Hole #3 of 5
- 2013/08 – Werewolves: The Hunger #3 of 3 ("Unleashed" tie-in)
- 2013/08 – Zombies: The Cursed #2 of 3 ("Unleashed" tie-in)
- 2013/08 – Demons: The Unseen #3 of 3 ("Unleashed" tie-in)
- 2013/08 – Wonderland #13
- 2013/08 – Grimm Fairy Tales #88
- 2013/08 – Realm Knights #1 of 4
- 2013/08 – Oz #2 of 6
- 2013/08 – No Tomorrow #1 of 5
- 2013/08 – Grimm Fairy Tales: 2013 Special Edition ("Unleashed" #5 of 6)
- 2013/08 – Robyn Hood: Wanted #4 of 5
- 2013/09 – Hunters: The Shadowlands #4 of 5 ("Unleashed" tie-in)
- 2013/09 – Wonderland: Down the Rabbit Hole #4 of 5
- 2013/09 – Grimm Fairy Tales #89
- 2013/09 – Wonderland #14
- 2013/09 – Zombies: The Cursed #3 of 3 ("Unleashed" tie-in)
- 2013/09 – Wonderland #15
- 2013/09 – Realm Knights #2 of 4
- 2013/09 – No Tomorrow #2 of 5
- 2013/10 – Wonderland: Down the Rabbit Hole #5 of 5
- 2013/10 – Wonderland: Through the Looking Glass #1 of 5
- 2013/10 – Grimm Fairy Tales: Giant-Sized Special ("Unleashed" #6 of 6)
- 2013/10 – Grimm Fairy Tales: 2013 Halloween Special
- 2013/10 – Hunters: The Shadowlands #5 of 5 ("Unleashed" tie-in)
- 2013/10 – Oz #3 of 6
- 2013/10 – Robyn Hood: Wanted #5 of 5
- 2013/10 – Wonderland #16
- 2013/10 – No Tomorrow #3 of 5
- 2013/10 – Wonderland: Through the Looking Glass #2 of 5
- 2013/10 – Grimm Fairy Tales #90
- 2013/10 – Realm Knights #3 of 4
- 2013/11 – Oz #4 of 6
- 2013/11 – Grimm Fairy Tales #91
- 2013/11 – Wonderland #17
- 2013/11 – Wonderland: Through the Looking Glass #3 of 5
- 2013/11 – Quest #1 of 5
- 2013/12 – Realm Knights #4 of 4
- 2013/12 – Wonderland #18
- 2013/12 – Grimm Fairy Tales: 2013 Holiday Edition
- 2013/12 – No Tomorrow #4 of 5
- 2013/12 – Code Red #1 of 5
- 2013/12 – Wonderland: Through the Looking Glass #4 of 5
- 2013/12 – Oz #5 of 6
- 2013/12 – Quest #2 of 5
- 2013/12 – Grimm Fairy Tales #92

=== 2014 ===
- 2014/01 – Wonderland: Through the Looking Glass #5 of 5
- 2014/01 – Wonderland #19
- 2014/01 – No Tomorrow #5 of 5
- 2014/01 – The Dark Queen: Age of Darkness
- 2014/01 – Quest #3 of 5
- 2014/01 – Wonderland: Asylum #1 of 5
- 2014/01 – Grimm Fairy Tales #93
- 2014/01 – Code Red #2 of 5
- 2014/01 – Tales from Oz: Tin Man
- 2014/02 – Ascension #1 of 5
- 2014/02 – Oz #6 of 6
- 2014/02 – Code Red #3 of 5
- 2014/02 – Robyn Hood: Age of Darkness
- 2014/02 – Wonderland: Clash of Queens #1 of 5
- 2014/02 – Wonderland #20
- 2014/02 – Wonderland: Asylum #2 of 5
- 2014/02 – Tales from Oz: Cowardly Lion
- 2014/02 – Grimm Fairy Tales #94
- 2014/02 – Quest #4 of 5
- 2014/03 – Tales from Oz: Scarecrow
- 2014/03 – Code Red #4 of 5
- 2014/03 – Grimm Fairy Tales #95
- 2014/03 – Ascension #2 of 5
- 2014/03 – Neverland: Age of Darkness #1 of 4
- 2014/03 – Wonderland: Asylum #3 of 5
- 2014/03 – Wonderland #21
- 2014/03 – Robyn Hood: Legend #1 of 5
- 2014/03 – Wonderland': Clash of Queens #2 of 5
- 2014/03 – Quest #5 of 5
- 2014/04 – Grimm Fairy Tales #96
- 2014/04 – Ascension #3 of 5
- 2014/04 – Robyn Hood: Legend #2 of 5
- 2014/04 – Neverland: Age of Darkness #2 of 4
- 2014/04 – Inferno: Age of Darkness
- 2014/04 – Godstorm: Hercules Payne #1 of 5
- 2014/04 – Wonderland #22
- 2014/04 – Helsing #1 of 4
- 2014/04 – Code Red #5 of 5
- 2014/04 – Wonderland: Clash of Queens #3 of 5
- 2014/04 – Wonderland: Asylum #4 of 5
- 2014/05 – Warlord of Oz #1 of 6
- 2014/05 – The Dark One: Age of Darkness
- 2014/05 – Grimm Fairy Tales #97
- 2014/05 – Ascension #4 of 5
- 2014/05 – Neverland: Age of Darkness #3 of 4
- 2014/05 – Wonderland: Clash of Queens #4 of 5
- 2014/05 – Wonderland: Asylum #5 of 5
- 2014/05 – Wonderland #23
- 2014/05 – Robyn Hood: Legend #3 of 5
- 2014/05 – Grimm Fairy Tales: 2014 Annual
- 2014/05 – Helsing #2 of 4
- 2014/05 – Grimm Fairy Tales #0 (Free Comic Book Day)
- 2014/05 – Godstorm: Hercules Payne #2 of 5
- 2014/06 – Grimm Fairy Tales #98
- 2014/06 – Ascension #5 of 5
- 2014/06 – Neverland: Age of Darkness #4 of 4
- 2014/06 – Wonderland: Clash of Queens #5 of 5
- 2014/06 – Wonderland #24
- 2014/06 – Helsing #3 of 4
- 2014/06 – Oz: Age of Darkness
- 2014/06 – Wonderland: Age of Darkness
- 2014/06 – Godstorm: Age of Darkness
- 2014/06 – Robyn Hood: Legend #4 of 5
- 2014/06 – Warlord of Oz #2 of 6
- 2014/06 – Godstorm: Hercules Payne #3 of 5
- 2014/07 – Grimm Fairy Tales #99
- 2014/07 – Grimm Fairy Tales #100
- 2014/07 – Grimm Fairy Tales: 2014 Giant-Sized
- 2014/07 – Realm War: Age of Darkness #1 of 12
- 2014/07 – Wonderland #25
- 2014/07 – Helsing #4 of 4
- 2014/07 – Realm Knight: Age of Darkness
- 2014/07 – Robyn Hood: Legend #5 of 5
- 2014/07 – Warlord of Oz #3 of 6
- 2014/07 – Grimm Tales of Terror #1 of 13
- 2014/07 – Grimm Fairy Tales vs. Wonderland #1 of 4
- 2014/07 – Godstorm: Hercules Payne #4 of 5
- 2014/07 – Grimm Fairy Tales: 2014 Swimsuit Special
- 2014/08 – Goddess, Inc. #1 of 5
- 2014/08 – Masumi: Blades of Sin #1 of 4
- 2014/08 – Inferno: Rings of Hell #1 of 3
- 2014/08 – Wonderland #26
- 2014/08 – Grimm Fairy Tales vs. Wonderland #2 of 4
- 2014/08 – Grimm Fairy Tales #101
- 2014/08 – Robyn Hood #1
- 2014/08 – Realm War: Age of Darkness #2 of 12
- 2014/08 – Warlord of Oz #4 of 6
- 2014/08 – Godstorm: Hercules Payne #5 of 5
- 2014/09 – Grimm Tales of Terror #2 of 13
- 2014/09 – Goddess, Inc. #2 of 5
- 2014/09 – Inferno: Rings of Hell #2 of 3
- 2014/09 – Grimm Fairy Tales #102
- 2014/09 – Wonderland #27
- 2014/09 – Grimm Fairy Tales vs. Wonderland #3 of 4
- 2014/09 – Grimm Tales of Terror #3 of 13
- 2014/09 – Robyn Hood #2
- 2014/09 – Realm War: Age of Darkness #3 of 12
- 2014/09 – Warlord of Oz #5 of 6
- 2014/09 – Masumi: Blades of Sin #2 of 4
- 2014/10 – Grimm Fairy Tales: 2014 Halloween Special
- 2014/10 – Masumi: Blades of Sin #3 of 4
- 2014/10 – Grimm Tales of Terror #4 of 13
- 2014/10 – Wonderland #28
- 2014/10 – Goddess, Inc. #3 of 5
- 2014/10 – Grimm Fairy Tales #103
- 2014/10 – Grimm Fairy Tales vs. Wonderland #4 of 4
- 2014/10 – Dark Shaman #1 of 4
- 2014/10 – Inferno: Rings of Hell #3 of 3
- 2014/10 – Robyn Hood #3
- 2014/10 – Warlord of Oz #6 of 6
- 2014/10 – Realm War: Age of Darkness #4 of 12
- 2014/11 – Cinderella: Age of Darkness #1 of 3
- 2014/11 – Masumi: Blades of Sin #4 of 4
- 2014/11 – Goddess, Inc. #4 of 5
- 2014/11 – Grimm Fairy Tales #104
- 2014/11 – Grimm Fairy Tales: 2014 Holiday Edition
- 2014/11 – Dark Shaman #2 of 4
- 2014/11 – Robyn Hood #4
- 2014/11 – Wonderland #29
- 2014/11 – Tales from Oz: Glinda
- 2014/12 – Grimm Tales of Terror #5 of 13
- 2014/12 – Realm War: Age of Darkness #5 of 12
- 2014/12 – Grimm Fairy Tales #105
- 2014/12 – Goddess, Inc. #5 of 5
- 2014/12 – Cinderella: Age of Darkness #2 of 3
- 2014/12 – Tales from Oz: Adraste
- 2014/12 – The Jungle Book: Fall of the Wild #1 of 5
- 2014/12 – Robyn Hood #5
- 2014/12 – Dark Shaman #3 of 4
- 2014/12 – Wonderland #30

=== 2015 ===
- 2015/01 – Grimm Tales of Terror #6 of 13
- 2015/01 – Grimm Fairy Tales #106
- 2015/01 – Wonderland #31
- 2015/01 – Cinderella: Age of Darkness #3 of 3
- 2015/01 – Tales from Oz: Zamora
- 2015/01 – Realm War: Age of Darkness #6 of 12
- 2015/01 – Dark Shaman #4 of 4
- 2015/01 – The Jungle Book: Fall of the Wild #2 of 5
- 2015/01 – Robyn Hood #6
- 2015/02 – Grimm Fairy Tales #107
- 2015/02 – White Queen: Age of Darkness #1 of 3
- 2015/02 – Grimm Tales of Terror #7 of 13
- 2015/02 – Wonderland #32
- 2015/02 – Realm War: Age of Darkness #7 of 12
- 2015/02 – Grimm Tales of Terror #8 of 13
- 2015/02 – Robyn Hood #7
- 2015/02 – The Jungle Book: Fall of the Wild #3 of 5
- 2015/02 – The Little Mermaid #1 of 5
- 2015/03 – Grimm Fairy Tales #108
- 2015/03 – White Queen: Age of Darkness #2 of 3
- 2015/03 – Robyn Hood #8
- 2015/03 – The Little Mermaid #2 of 5
- 2015/03 – Wonderland #33
- 2015/03 – Realm War: Age of Darkness #8 of 12
- 2015/03 – Grimm Tales of Terror #9 of 13
- 2015/04 – Robyn Hood #9
- 2015/04 – White Queen: Age of Darkness #3 of 3
- 2015/04 – The Jungle Book: Fall of the Wild #4 of 5
- 2015/04 – Grimm Fairy Tales #109
- 2015/04 – Grimm Tales of Terror #10 of 13
- 2015/04 – Wonderland #34
- 2015/04 – The Little Mermaid #3 of 5
- 2015/04 – Wonderland: 2015 Special Edition [Free Comic Book Day]
- 2015/05 – Grimm Fairy Tales #110
- 2015/05 – Robyn Hood #10
- 2015/05 – Oz: Reign of the Witch Queen #1 of 6
- 2015/05 – The Jungle Book: Fall of the Wild #5 of 5
- 2015/05 – Realm War: Age of Darkness #9 of 12
- 2015/05 – The Little Mermaid #4 of 5
- 2015/05 – Wonderland #35
- 2015/05 – Grimm Tales of Terror #11 of 13
- 2015/05 – Snow White: 10th Anniversary Special #1
- 2015/06 – Grimm Fairy Tales #111
- 2015/06 – Robyn Hood #11
- 2015/06 – The Little Mermaid #5 of 5
- 2015/06 – Wonderland #36
- 2015/06 – Realm War: Age of Darkness #10 of 12
- 2015/06 – Oz: Reign of the Witch Queen #2 of 6
- 2015/06 – Red Riding Hood: 10th Anniversary Special #2
- 2015/07 – Grimm Fairy Tales #112
- 2015/07 – Robyn Hood #12
- 2015/07 – Wonderland #37
- 2015/07 – Grimm Tales of Terror #12 of 13
- 2015/07 – Grimm Tales of Terror #13 of 13
- 2015/07 – Oz: Reign of the Witch Queen #3 of 6
- 2015/07 – Coven #1 of 5
- 2015/07 – Alice in Wonderland: 10th Anniversary Special #3
- 2015/08 – Grimm Fairy Tales #113
- 2015/08 – Robyn Hood #13
- 2015/08 – Wonderland #38
- 2015/08 – Realm War: Age of Darkness #11 of 12
- 2015/08 – Oz: Reign of the Witch Queen #4 of 6
- 2015/08 – Coven #2 of 5
- 2015/08 – Van Helsing vs. Dracula #1 of 5
- 2015/09 – Grimm Fairy Tales #114
- 2015/09 – Robyn Hood #14
- 2015/09 – Wonderland #39
- 2015/09 – Coven #3 of 5
- 2015/09 – Van Helsing vs. Dracula #2 of 5
- 2015/09 – Death: 10th Anniversary Special #4
- 2015/09 – Grimm Fairy Tales: 2015 Halloween Special
- 2015/10 – Oz: Reign of the Witch Queen #5 of 6
- 2015/10 – Cinderella: 10th Anniversary Special #5
- 2015/10 – Realm War: Age of Darkness #12 of 12
- 2015/10 – Wonderland #40
- 2015/10 – Van Helsing vs. Dracula #3 of 5
- 2015/10 – Grimm Fairy Tales #115
- 2015/10 – Robyn Hood #15
- 2015/11 – Grimm Fairy Tales #116
- 2015/11 – Coven #4 of 5
- 2015/11 – Robyn Hood #16
- 2015/11 – Grimm Tales of Terror: Vol. 2 #1 of 13
- 2015/11 – Grimm Tales of Terror: Vol. 2 #2 of 13
- 2015/11 – Wonderland #41
- 2015/11 – Robyn Hood: 2015 Holiday Special
- 2015/11 – Oz: Reign of the Witch Queen #6
- 2015/12 – Realm Knights: 2015 Annual
- 2015/12 – Van Helsing: 10th Anniversary Special #6
- 2015/12 – Robyn Hood #17
- 2015/12 – Wonderland #42
- 2015/12 – Coven #5 of 5
- 2015/12 – Grimm Tales of Terror: Vol. 2 #3 of 13
- 2015/12 – Van Helsing vs. Dracula #4 of 5
- 2015/12 – Grimm Fairy Tales #117
- 2015/12 – Realm Knights: 2015 Giant-Size

=== 2016 ===
- 2016/01 – Robyn Hood #18
- 2016/01 – Inferno: Resurrection #1 of 5
- 2016/01 – Grimm Fairy Tales #118
- 2016/01 – Steampunk #1 of 2
- 2016/01 – Wonderland #43
- 2016/01 – Red Agent #1 of 5
- 2016/01 – Grimm Tales of Terror: Vol. 2 #4 of 13
- 2016/02 – Robyn Hood #19
- 2016/02 – Grimm Fairy Tales #119
- 2016/02 – Wonderland #44
- 2016/02 – Oz: No Place Like Home [one-shot]
- 2016/02 – Red Agent #2 of 5
- 2016/03 – Grimm Tales of Terror: Vol. 2 #5 of 13
- 2016/03 – Van Helsing vs. Dracula #5 of 5
- 2016/03 – Wonderland #45
- 2016/03 – Grimm Fairy Tales #120
- 2016/03 – Hellchild #1 of 5
- 2016/03 – Robyn Hood #20
- 2016/03 – Red Agent #3 of 5
- 2016/03 – Grimm Tales of Terror: Vol. 2 #6 of 13
- 2016/04 – Inferno: Resurrection #2 of 5
- 2016/04 – Steampunk #2 of 2
- 2016/04 – Grimm Fairy Tales #121
- 2016/04 – Wonderland #46
- 2016/04 – Hellchild #2 of 5
- 2016/04 – Red Agent #4 of 5
- 2016/05 – Wonderland #47
- 2016/05 – Grimm Tales of Terror: Vol. 2 #7 of 13
- 2016/05 – Grimm Tales of Terror: Vol. 2 #8 of 13
- 2016/05 – Grimm Fairy Tales #122
- 2016/05 – Hellchild #3 of 5
- 2016/05 – Inferno: Resurrection #3 of 5
- 2016/05 – Robyn Hood: 2016 Annual
- 2016/06 – Hellchild #4 of 5
- 2016/06 – Death Force #1 of 6
- 2016/06 – Wonderland #48
- 2016/06 – Snow White vs. Snow White #1 of 2
- 2016/06 – Inferno: Resurrection #4 of 5
- 2016/06 – Red Agent #5 of 5
- 2016/06 – Grimm Fairy Tales #123
- 2016/06 – Death Force #2 of 6
- 2016/07 – Grimm Fairy Tales #124
- 2016/07 – Robyn Hood: I Love NY #1 of 12
- 2016/07 – Grimm Tales of Terror: Vol. 2 #10 of 13
- 2016/07 – Wonderland #49
- 2016/07 – Robyn Hood: I Love NY #2 of 12
- 2016/07 – Death Force #3 of 6
- 2016/07 – Hellchild #5 of 5
- 2016/07 – Snow White vs. Snow White #2 of 2
- 2016/07 – Grimm Fairy Tales: 2016 Swimsuit Special
- 2016/08 – Death Force #4 of 6
- 2016/08 – Van Helsing vs. Frankenstein #1 of 5
- 2016/08 – Wonderland #50
- 2016/08 – Robyn Hood: I Love NY #3 of 12
- 2016/08 – Grimm Tales of Terror: Vol. 2 #11 of 13
- 2016/08 – Grimm Fairy Tales #125
- 2016/08 – Grimm Fairy Tales: Apocalypse #1
- 2016/09 – Grimm Tales of Terror: Vol. 2 #12 of 13
- 2016/09 – Van Helsing vs. Frankenstein #2 of 5
- 2016/09 – Robyn Hood: I Love NY #4 of 12
- 2016/09 – Wonderland: Finale
- 2016/09 – Grimm Fairy Tales: Apocalypse #2
- 2016/10 – Grimm Tales of Terror: Vol. 2 #13 of 13
- 2016/10 – Grimm Fairy Tales: Genesis – Heroes Reborn
- 2016/10 – Inferno: Resurrection #5 of 5
- 2016/10 – Death Force #5 of 6
- 2016/10 – Grimm Fairy Tales: 2016 Annual
- 2016/10 – Robyn Hood: I Love NY #5 of 12
- 2016/10 – Grimm Fairy Tales: 2016 Halloween Special
- 2016/10 – Van Helsing vs. Frankenstein #3 of 5
- 2016/10 – Grimm Fairy Tales: 2016 Photoshoot Edition
- 2016/10 – Grimm Fairy Tales: Apocalypse #3
- 2016/11 – Death Force #6 of 6
- 2016/11 – Hellchild: The Unholy #1
- 2016/11 – Robyn Hood: I Love NY #6 of 12
- 2016/11 – Grimm Fairy Tales Genesis: Heroes Rising
- 2016/11 – Red Agent: The Human Order #1
- 2016/11 – Grimm Tales of Terror: 2016 Holiday Special
- 2016/12 – Hellchild: The Unholy #2
- 2016/12 – The Jungle Book: 2016 Holiday Special
- 2016/12 – Van Helsing vs. Frankenstein #4 of 5
- 2016/12 – Grimm Fairy Tales: Vol. 2 #1
- 2016/12 – Cinderella: Serial Killer Princess #1
- 2016/12 – Grimm Fairy Tales: Apocalypse #4
- 2016/12 – Robyn Hood: I Love NY #7 of 12

=== 2017 ===
- 2017/01 – Grimm Tales of Terror: Vol. 3 #1
- 2017/01 – Red Agent: The Human Order #2
- 2017/01 – Grimm Fairy Tales: Vol. 2 #2
- 2017/01 – Cinderella: Serial Killer Princess #2
- 2017/01 – Robyn Hood: I Love NY #8 of 12
- 2017/01 – Hellchild: The Unholy #3
- 2017/02 – Van Helsing vs. Frankenstein #5 of 5
- 2017/02 – Red Agent: The Human Order #3
- 2017/02 – Grimm Tales of Terror: Vol. 3 #2
- 2017/02 – Day of the Dead #1
- 2017/02 – Van Helsing vs. The Mummy of Amun-Ra #1
- 2017/02 – Grimm Fairy Tales Steampunk: Alice In Wonderland [one-shot]
- 2017/02 – Grimm Fairy Tales: Apocalypse #5
- 2017/02 – Van Helsing vs. The Mummy of Amun-Ra #2
- 2017/02 – Robyn Hood: I Love NY #9 of 12
- 2017/03 – Grimm Fairy Tales: Vol. 2 #3
- 2017/03 – Hellchild: The Unholy #4
- 2017/03 – Red Agent: The Human Order #4
- 2017/03 – Day of the Dead #2
- 2017/03 – Cinderella: Serial Killer Princess #3
- 2017/03 – Grimm Tales of Terror: Vol. 3 #3
- 2017/03 – Van Helsing vs. The Mummy of Amun-Ra #3
- 2017/03 – Robyn Hood: I Love NY #10 of 12
- 2017/03 – Grimm Fairy Tales: Vol. 2 #4
- 2017/03 – Red Agent: The Human Order #5
- 2017/04 – Grimm Tales of Terror: Vol. 3 #4
- 2017/04 – Cinderella: Serial Killer Princess #4
- 2017/04 – Van Helsing vs. The Mummy of Amun-Ra #4
- 2017/04 – Robyn Hood: I Love NY #11 of 12
- 2017/04 – Grimm Fairy Tales: Vol. 2 #5
- 2017/04 – Day of the Dead #3
- 2017/04 – 2017 April Fools' Edition: Tales Of Terror
- 2017/04 – Hellchild: The Unholy #5
- 2017/05 – Red Agent: The Human Order #6
- 2017/05 – Grimm Fairy Tales #0 Free Comic Book Day
- 2017/05 – Day of the Dead #4
- 2017/05 – Robyn Hood: I Love NY #12 of 12
- 2017/05 – Red Agent: The Human Order #7
- 2017/05 – Wonderland: Birth of Madness [one-shot]
- 2017/05 – Grimm Fairy Tales: Vol. 2 #6
- 2017/05 – Grimm Tales of Terror: Vol. 3 #5
- 2017/05 – Van Helsing vs. The Mummy of Amun-Ra #5
- 2017/06 – Day of the Dead #5
- 2017/06 – Grimm Tales of Terror: Vol. 3 #6
- 2017/06 – Red Agent: The Human Order #8
- 2017/06 – Robyn Hood: Tarot [one-shot]
- 2017/07 – Day of the Dead #6
- 2017/07 – Van Helsing vs. The Mummy of Amun-Ra #6
- 2017/07 – Grimm Fairy Tales: 2017 Swimsuit Special
- 2017/07 – Grimm Fairy Tales: Vol. 2 #7
- 2017/07 – Grimm Tales of Terror: Vol. 3 #7
- 2017/07 – Van Helsing vs. The Werewolf #1
- 2017/07 – Robyn Hood: The Hunt #1
- 2017/08 – Red Agent: The Human Order #9
- 2017/08 – Grimm Fairy Tales: Tarot #1
- 2017/08 – Grimm Tales of Terror: Vol. 3 #8
- 2017/08 – Grimm Fairy Tales: 2017 Armed Forces Edition
- 2017/08 – Van Helsing vs. The Werewolf #2
- 2017/08 – Grimm Fairy Tales: Vol. 2 #8
- 2017/09 – Robyn Hood: The Hunt #2
- 2017/09 – Van Helsing vs. The Werewolf #3
- 2017/09 – Grimm Tales of Terror: Vol. 3 #9
- 2017/10 – Robyn Hood: The Hunt #3
- 2017/10 – Grimm Fairy Tales: Vol. 2 #9
- 2017/10 – Grimm Fairy Tales: Tarot #2
- 2017/10 – Van Helsing vs. The Werewolf #4
- 2017/10 – Dance of The Dead #1
- 2017/10 – Grimm Fairy Tales: 2017 Halloween Special
- 2017/11 – Neverland: Return of Hook (one-shot)
- 2017/11 – Robyn Hood: The Hunt #4
- 2017/11 – Grimm Fairy Tales: Vol. 2 #10
- 2017/11 – Dance of The Dead #2
- 2017/11 – Grimm Tales of Terror #10
- 2017/11 – Van Helsing vs. The Werewolf #5
- 2017/11 – Grimm Fairy Tales: Tarot #3
- 2017/11 – Robyn Hood: The Hunt #5
- 2017/12 – Van Helsing vs. The Werewolf #6
- 2017/12 – Grimm Fairy Tales: 2017 Holiday Special
- 2017/12 – Grimm Tales of Terror #11
- 2017/12 – Robyn Hood: The Hunt #6

=== 2018 ===
- 2018/01 – Dance of The Dead #3
- 2018/01 – Van Helsing vs. Robyn Hood #1
- 2018/01 – Robyn Hood: The Curse #1
- 2018/01 – Belle: Beast Hunter #1
- 2018/01 – Grimm Fairy Tales: Vol. 2 #11
- 2018/01 – Grimm Fairy Tales: Tarot #4
- 2018/01 – Grimm Tales of Terror: Black & White Special Edition
- 2018/02 – Robyn Hood: The Curse #2
- 2018/02 – Grimm Tales of Terror: Vol. 3 #12
- 2018/02 – Van Helsing vs. Robyn Hood #2
- 2018/02 – Dance of The Dead #4
- 2018/02 – Belle: Beast Hunter #2
- 2018/02 – The Musketeers #1
- 2018/02 – Grimm Fairy Tales: Vol. 2 #12
- 2018/02 – Grimm Tales of Terror: Vol. 3 #13
- 2018/03 – Van Helsing vs. Robyn Hood #3
- 2018/03 – Hellchild: Inferno [one-shot]
- 2018/03 – Grimm Fairy Tales: Vol. 2 #13
- 2018/03 – Grimm Fairy Tales: Tarot #5
- 2018/03 – The Musketeers #2
- 2018/03 – Robyn Hood: The Curse #3
- 2018/04 – Grimm Fairy Tales: Vol. 2 #14
- 2018/04 – The Musketeers #3
- 2018/04 – Belle: Beast Hunter #3
- 2018/04 – Van Helsing vs. Robyn Hood #4
- 2018/04 – Grimm Tales of Terror: Vol. 4 #1
- 2018/04 – Robyn Hood: The Curse #4
- 2018/04 – Dance of the Dead #5
- 2018/05 – Jasmine: Crown of Kings #1
- 2018/05 – Oz: The Wizard [one-shot]
- 2018/05 – Grimm Tales of Terror: Vol. 4 #2
- 2018/05 – Grimm Fairy Tales: Vol. 2 #15
- 2018/05 – Grimm Tales of Terror: Vol. 4 #3
- 2018/05 – The Musketeers #4
- 2018/05 – Dance of the Dead #6
- 2018/05 – Robyn Hood: The Curse #5
- 2018/06 – Jasmine: Crown of Kings #2
- 2018/06 – Grimm Fairy Tales: Tarot #6
- 2018/06 – Grimm Fairy Tales: Vol. 2 #16
- 2018/06 – Grimm Fairy Tales: Vol. 2 #17
- 2018/06 – Grimm Tales of Terror: Vol. 4 #4
- 2018/07 – Jasmine: Crown of Kings #3
- 2018/07 – Robyn Hood: The Curse #6
- 2018/07 – Grimm Fairy Tales: 2018 Cosplay Special
- 2018/07 – The Musketeers #5
- 2018/07 – Grimm Tales of Terror: Vol. 4 #5
- 2018/07 – Revenge of Wonderland #1
- 2018/07 – Grimm Fairy Tales: Vol. 2 #18
- 2018/08 – Belle: Beast Hunter #4
- 2018/08 – Jasmine: Crown of Kings #4
- 2018/08 – Revenge of Wonderland #2
- 2018/08 – Grimm Fairy Tales: Vol. 2 #19
- 2018/09 – Jasmine: Crown of Kings #5
- 2018/09 – Grimm Tales of Terror: Vol. 4 #6
- 2018/09 – Grimm Tales of Terror: 2018 Halloween Special
- 2018/09 – Revenge of Wonderland #3
- 2018/09 – Grimm Tales of Terror: Vol. 4 #7
- 2018/09 – Grimm Fairy Tales: Vol. 2 #20
- 2018/09 – Grimm Fairy Tales: Vol. 2 #21
- 2018/09 – The Black Knight #1
- 2018/10 – Grimm Fairy Tales: Vol. 2 #22
- 2018/10 – Belle: Beast Hunter #5
- 2018/10 – Revenge of Wonderland #4
- 2018/10 – Grimm Tales of Terror: Vol. 4 #8
- 2018/11 – Grimm Fairy Tales: Vol. 2 #23
- 2018/11 – Van Helsing: Sword of Heaven #1
- 2018/11 – Grimm Tales of Terror: Vol. 4 #9
- 2018/11 – Revenge of Wonderland #5
- 2018/12 – Grimm Fairy Tales: Vol. 2 #24
- 2018/12 – The Black Knight #2
- 2018/12 – Van Helsing: Sword of Heaven #2
- 2018/12 – Grimm Fairy Tales: 2018 Holiday Special
- 2018/12 – Belle: Beast Hunter #6
- 2018/12 – Grimm Tales of Terror: Vol. 4 #10

=== 2019 ===
- 2019/01 – Revenge of Wonderland #6
- 2019/01 – The Black Knight #3
- 2019/01 – Van Helsing: Sword of Heaven #3
- 2019/01 – Grimm Fairy Tales: Vol. 2 #25
- 2019/01 – Grimm Tales of Terror: Vol. 4 #11
- 2019/01 – Grimm Fairy Tales: 2019 Annual
- 2019/01 – The Black Knight #4
- 2019/01 – Grimm Universe Presents 2019
- 2019/02 – Van Helsing: Sword of Heaven #4
- 2019/02 – Grimm Tales of Terror: Vol. 4 #12
- 2019/02 – Robyn Hood: Outlaw #1
- 2019/02 – Zodiac #1
- 2019/02 – Grimm Fairy Tales: 2019 Giant Size
- 2019/03 – Van Helsing: Sword of Heaven #5
- 2019/03 – Robyn Hood: Outlaw #2
- 2019/03 – Grimm Tales of Terror: Vol. 4 #13
- 2019/03 – The Black Knight #5
- 2019/03 – Gretel #1
- 2019/03 – Grimm Fairy Tales: Vol. 2 #26
- 2019/03 – Zodiac #2
- 2019/04 – Van Helsing: Sword of Heaven #6
- 2019/04 – Hellchild: Blood Money #1
- 2019/04 – Robyn Hood: Outlaw #3
- 2019/04 – Oz: Heart of Magic #1
- 2019/04 – Gretel #2
- 2019/04 – Grimm Fairy Tales: Vol. 2 #27
- 2019/04 – Zodiac #3
- 2019/05 – Dragonsblood #1
- 2019/05 – Hellchild: Blood Money #2
- 2019/05 – Robyn Hood: Outlaw #4
- 2019/05 – Oz: Heart of Magic #2
- 2019/05 – Gretel #3
- 2019/05 – Grimm Fairy Tales: Vol. 2 #28
- 2019/06 – Dragonsblood #2
- 2019/06 – Hellchild: Blood Money #3
- 2019/06 – Robyn Hood: Outlaw #5
- 2019/06 – Gretel #4
- 2019/06 – Grimm Fairy Tales: Vol. 2 #29
- 2019/06 – Oz: Heart of Magic #3
- 2019/07 – Dragonsblood #3
- 2019/07 – Grimm Fairy Tales: 2019 Swimsuit Special
- 2019/07 – Belle: Oath of Thorns #1
- 2019/07 – Gretel #5
- 2019/07 – Robyn Hood: Outlaw #6
- 2019/07 – Hellchild: Blood Money #4
- 2019/07 – Oz: Heart of Magic #4
- 2019/08 – Dragonsblood #4
- 2019/08 – Grimm Fairy Tales: Vol. 2 #30
- 2019/08 – Van Helsing vs. Dracula's Daughter #1
- 2019/08 – Grimm Universe Presents: Fall 2019
- 2019/09 – Oz: Heart of Magic #5
- 2019/09 – Mystere #1
- 2019/09 – Belle Oath of Thorns #2
- 2019/09 – Van Helsing vs. Dracula's Daughter #2
- 2019/09 – Grimm Tales of Terror Presents: The Bridgewater Triangle #1
- 2019/09 – Grimm Fairy Tales: Vol. 2 #31
- 2019/10 – Mystere #2
- 2019/10 – Grimm Fairy Tales: Vol. 2 #32
- 2019/10 – Grimm Tales of Terror 2019 Halloween Special
- 2019/10 – Van Helsing vs. Dracula's Daughter #3
- 2019/10 – Grimm Tales of Terror Presents: The Bridgewater Triangle #2
- 2019/11 – Grimm Fairy Tales: 2019 Holiday Special
- 2019/11 – Mystere #3
- 2019/11 – Robyn Hood: Vigilante #1
- 2019/11 – Grimm Fairy Tales: 2019 Armed Forces Edition
- 2019/11 – Van Helsing vs. Dracula's Daughter #4
- 2019/12 – Grimm Fairy Tales: Vol. 2 #33
- 2019/12 – Mystere: Revelations and Resurrections #4
- 2019/12 – Belle: Oath of Thorns #3
- 2019/12 – Robyn Hood: Vigilante #2
- 2019/12 – Grimm Tales of Terror Presents: The Bridgewater Triangle #3

=== 2020 ===
- 2020/01 – Grimm Fairy Tales: Vol. 2 #34
- 2020/01 – Van Helsing vs. Dracula's Daughter #5
- 2020/01 – Red Agent: Island of Dr. Moreau #1
- 2020/01 – Mystere: Black Friday #5
- 2020/01 – Robyn Hood: Vigilante #3
- 2020/01 – Belle: Oath of Thorns #4
- 2020/02 – Red Agent: Island of Dr. Moreau #2
- 2020/02 – Robyn Hood: Vigilante #4
- 2020/02 – Grimm Fairy Tales: Vol. 2 #35
- 2020/02 – Belle: Oath of Thorns #5
- 2020/02 – Van Helsing vs. The League of Monsters #1
- 2020/02 – Grimm Universe Presents 2020
- 2020/02 – Grimm Fairy Tales: Vol. 2 #36
- 2020/03 – Red Agent: Island of Dr. Moreau #3
- 2020/03 – Robyn Hood: Vigilante #5
- 2020/03 – Shang #1
- 2020/03 – Van Helsing vs. The League of Monsters #2
- 2020/04 – Red Agent: Island of Dr. Moreau #4
- 2020/04 – Belle: Oath of Thorns #6
- 2020/04 – Grimm Fairy Tales: Vol. 2 #37
- 2020/04 – Robyn Hood: Vigilante #6
- 2020/04 – Grimm Fairy Tales: Universus #1
- 2020/06 – Grimm Fairy Tales: 2020 Annual
- 2020/06 – Red Agent: Island of Dr. Moreau #5
- 2020/07 – Belle vs. The Black Knight #1
- 2020/07 – Van Helsing vs. The League of Monsters #3
- 2020/07 – Grimm Fairy Tales: Vol. 2 #38
- 2020/07 – Shang #2
- 2020/07 – Grimm Fairy Tales: Vol. 2 #39
- 2020/07 – Robyn Hood: Justice #1
- 2020/08 – Robyn Hood: Justice #2
- 2020/08 – Shang #3
- 2020/08 – Grimm Fairy Tales: Vol. 2 #40
- 2020/08 – Van Helsing vs. The League of Monsters #4
- 2020/09 – Belle: Ghosts and Goblins (one-shot)
- 2020/09 – Robyn Hood: Justice #3
- 2020/09 – Belle: Hearts and Minds (one-shot)
- 2020/09 – Van Helsing vs. The League of Monsters #5
- 2020/09 – Grimm Tales of Terror Quarterly: Hellfire
- 2020/10 – Robyn Hood: Justice #4
- 2020/10 – Grimm Fairy Tales: Vol. 2 #41
- 2020/10 – Grimm Myths and Legends Quarterly: Ares
- 2020/10 – Grimm Tales of Terror Quarterly: 2020 Halloween Special
- 2020/10 – Van Helsing vs. The League of Monsters #6
- 2020/11 – Grimm Fairy Tales: 2020 Holiday Pinup Special
- 2020/11 – Grimm Fairy Tales: Vol. 2 #42
- 2020/11 – Belle: Horns of the Minotaur
- 2020/11 – Van Helsing Annual: Bloodlust
- 2020/11 – Robyn Hood: Justice #5
- 2020/11 – Belle: Targeted Prey (one-shot)
- 2020/12 – Grimm Fairy Tales: 2020 Holiday Special
- 2020/12 – Robyn Hood: Justice #6
- 2020/12 – Grimm Fairy Tales: Vol. 2 #43
- 2020/12 – Cinderella Annual: Bloody Xmas
- 2020/12 – Robyn Hood Annual: Worlds Apart

=== 2021 ===
- 2021/01 – Van Helsing #50
- 2021/01 – Robyn Hood: Iron Maiden #1
- 2021/01 – Belle: Dead of Winter
- 2021/01 – Van Helsing: Hellfire
- 2021/01 – Grimm Myths & Legends Quarterly: Gretel Witch Hunter
- 2021/02 – Grimm Fairy Tales: Vol. 2 #44
- 2021/02 – Grimm Spotlight: Black Knight vs. Lord of the Flies
- 2021/02 – Grimm Universe Presents Quarterly: Darkwatchers feat. Gretel
- 2021/02 – Grimm Fairy Tales: Vol. 2 #45
- 2021/02 – Robyn Hood: Iron Maiden #2
- 2021/03 – Grimm Myths & Legends Quarterly: Dark Princess
- 2021/03 – Grimm Fairy Tales: Vol. 2 #46
- 2021/03 – Robyn Hood: Cult of the Spider Queen
- 2021/03 – Belle: Thunder of Gods
- 2021/03 – Van Helsing: Black Annis
- 2021/03 – Grimm Fairy Tales: Vol. 2 #47
- 2021/04 – Grimm Tales of Terror Quarterly: H. H. Holmes
- 2021/04 – Man Goat & The Bunnyman #1
- 2021/04 – Grimm Spotlight: Mystere - Voodoo Dawn
- 2021/04 – Belle: King of Serpents
- 2021/04 – Grimm Universe Presents Quarterly: Steampunk
- 2021/05 – Van Helsing: Steampunk
- 2021/05 – Grimm Fairy Tales: Vol. 2 #48
- 2021/05 – Robyn Hood: Voodoo Dawn
- 2021/05 – Man Goat & The Bunnyman #2
- 2021/05 – Neverland 2021 Annual
- 2021/06 – Grimm Myths & Legends: Dragon Clan
- 2021/06 – Grimm Spotlight - Hercules Payne vs. The Scorpion Queen
- 2021/06 – Belle: Sirens
- 2021/06 – Grimm Fairy Tales: Vol. 2 #49
- 2021/06 – Oz Annual: Patchwork Girl
- 2021/07 – Man Goat & The Bunnyman #3
- 2021/07 – Grimm Fairy Tales: Vol. 2 #50
- 2021/07 – Robyn Hood: Goldilocks
- 2021/07 – Grimm Tales of Terror Quarterly: Game Night
- 2021/07 – Grimm Fairy Tales: 2021 Swimsuit Special
- 2021/08 – Van Helsing: The Invisible Woman
- 2021/08 – Grimm Universe Presents Quarterly: Zodiac vs Death Force
- 2021/08 – Belle: Dragon Clan
- 2021/08 – Grimm Spotlight: Red Agent: Beast of Belgium
- 2021/09 – Robyn Hood Annual: The Swarm
- 2021/09 – Grimm Fairy Tales: Vol. 2 #51
- 2021/09 – Wonderland Annual: Reign of Madness
- 2021/09 – Grimm Fairy Tales: Vol. 2 #52
- 2021/09 – Robyn Hood: Night of the Hunter
- 2021/10 – Van Helsing: Beast of Exmoor
- 2021/10 – Belle: Headless Horseman
- 2021/10 – Grimm Tales of Terror Quarterly: 2021 Halloween Special
- 2021/10 – Grimm Spotlight: Cinderella vs. Zombies
- 2021/10 – Grimm Fairy Tales: Vol. 2 #53
- 2021/11 – Van Helsing: Return of The League of Monsters Part 1
- 2021/11 – Grimm Tales of Terror Quarterly: Bachelorette Party
- 2021/11 – Grimm Tales of Terror Annual: Goddess of Death
- 2021/11 – Grimm Fairy Tales: Vol. 2 #54
- 2021/12 – Myths and Legends Quarterly - Blood Pharaoh
- 2021/12 – Grimm Myths and Legends Quarterly - Prophecy
- 2021/12 – Grimm Universe Presents Quarterly: 2021 Holiday Special
- 2021/12 – Robyn Hood: Hellfire
- 2021/12 – Belle: Kill Zone
- 2021/12 – Grimm Fairy Tales: Vol. 2 #55

=== 2022 ===
- 2022/01 – Grimm Spotlight: Hellchild
- 2022/01 – Robyn Hood: Home Sweet Home
- 2022/01 – Van Helsing: Return of the League of Monsters Part 2
- 2022/01 – Grimm Fairy Tales: Vol. 2 #56
- 2022/02 – Belle Annual #25
- 2022/02 – Grimm Spotlight: Gretel: Bloody Mary
- 2022/02 – Grimm Universe Presents Quarterly: The Black Knight
- 2022/02 – Belle: Queen of Serpents
- 2022/02 – Grimm Fairy Tales: Vol. 2 #57
- 2022/03 – Robyn Hood: Shadows of the Past
- 2022/03 – Myths & Legends Quarterly: Jack & Jill
- 2022/03 – Grimm Fairy Tales: Vol. 2 #58
- 2022/04 – Grimm Spotlight: Mystere - Divinity
- 2022/04 – Belle: War of the Giants
- 2022/04 – Van Helsing Annual: Hour of the Witch
- 2022/04 – Van Helsing: Shattered Soul
- 2022/04 – Grimm Tales of Terror Quarterly: Sea of Souls
- 2022/04 – Grimm Universe Presents Quarterly: Dracula's Daughter
- 2022/04 – Oz Annual: Dominion of Ozmo
- 2022/04 – Grimm Fairy Tales: Vol. 2 #59
- 2022/05 – Grimm Fairy Tales 2022 May the 4th Cosplay Special
- 2022/05 – Robyn Hood: Hearts of Darkness
- 2022/05 – Belle: Labyrinth
- 2022/05 – Myths & Legends Quarterly: Jasmine
- 2022/05 – Van Helsing: Bloodborne
- 2022/05 – Grimm Fairy Tales: Vol. 2 #60
- 2022/06 – Grimm Spotlight: Zodiac
- 2022/06 – Grimm Fairy Tales 2022 Swimsuit Special
- 2022/06 – Robyn Hood Annual: Children of Darkness
- 2022/06 – Grimm Tales of Terror Quarterly: Back to School
- 2022/06 – Grimm Fairy Tales: Vol. 2 #61
- 2022/07 – Van Helsing: From the Depths
- 2022/07 – Robyn Hood: The Children of Dr. Moreau
- 2022/07 – Belle: Return of Scylla
- 2022/08 – Grimm Spotlight: Iron Maiden
- 2022/08 – Grimm Fairy Tales: Vol. 2 #62
- 2022/08 – Grimm Universe Presents Quarterly: Sleeping Beauty
- 2022/08 – Grimm Fairy Tales: 2022 Annual
- 2022/08 – Myths & Legends Quarterly: Wonderland - War of Madness
- 2022/08 – Grimm Fairy Tales: Vol. 2 #63
- 2022/09 – Robyn Hood: Baba Yaga
- 2022/09 – Van Helsing: Flesh of My Blood
- 2022/09 – Belle: Hunt of the Centaurs
- 2022/09 – Grimm Fairy Tales: Vol. 2 #64
- 2022/10 – Grimm Tales of Terror Quarterly: Rise of Cthulhu
- 2022/10 – Grimm Fairy Tales 2022 Horror Pinup Special
- 2022/10 – Grimm Universe Presents Quarterly: 2022 Halloween Special
- 2022/10 – Grimm Spotlight: Cinderella vs. The Tooth Fairy
- 2022/10 – Grimm Fairy Tales: Vol. 2 #65
- 2022/11 – Oz: Return of the Wicked Witch #1
- 2022/11 – Grimm Fairy Tales 2022 Holiday Pinup Special
- 2022/11 – Belle Annual: Depths of Tartarus
- 2022/11 – Van Helsing: Rites of Shadows
- 2022/11 – Robyn Hood: Last Stop
- 2022/11 – Grimm Fairy Tales: Vol. 2 #66
- 2022/12 – Belle: Deep Freeze
- 2022/12 – Grimm Spotlight: Red Agent - Friendly Fire
- 2022/12 – Grimm Tales of Terror Quarterly: 2022 Holiday Special
- 2022/12 – Grimm Myths & Legends Quarterly: Blood of the Gods
- 2022/12 – Oz: Return of the Wicked Witch #2
- 2022/12 – Grimm Fairy Tales: Vol. 2 #67

=== 2023 ===
- 2023/01 – Robyn Hood: Dagon
- 2023/01 – Belle: Scream of the Banshee
- 2023/01 – Wonderland Annual: It's a Wonderland Life
- 2023/01 – Grimm Fairy Tales: Vol. 2 #68
- 2023/02 – Phoenix Files #1
- 2023/02 – Grimm Spotlight: Inferno - The Soul Collector
- 2023/02 – Grimm Tales of Terror Quarterly: 2023 Valentine's Day Special
- 2023/02 – Van Helsing: Deadly Alchemy
- 2023/02 – Grimm Universe Presents Quarterly: Cinderella - Fairy World Massacre
- 2023/02 – Grimm Fairy Tales: Vol. 2 #69
- 2023/03 – Oz: Return of the Wicked Witch #3
- 2023/03 – Gretel: Seeds of Despair
- 2023/03 – Van Helsing Annual: Sins of the Father
- 2023/03 – Belle: From Beyond
- 2023/03 – Phoenix Files #2
- 2023/03 – Myths & Legends Quarterly: Black Knight - Fate of Legends
- 2023/03 – Grimm Fairy Tales: Vol. 2 #70
- 2023/04 – Robyn Hood: The Crawling Chaos
- 2023/04 – Cinderella vs The Queen of Hearts #1
- 2023/04 – Grimm Tales of Terror Quarterly: Heart's Desire
- 2023/04 – Grimm Fairy Tales: Vol. 2 #71
- 2023/05 – Grimm Fairy Tales 2023 May the 4th Cosplay Special
- 2023/05 – Van Helsing: Finding Neverland
- 2023/05 – Mystere Annual: Spawn of the Abyss
- 2023/05 – Phoenix Files #3
- 2023/05 – Cinderella vs The Queen of Hearts #2
- 2023/05 – Man Goat & The Bunnyman: 2023 Spring Special
- 2023/05 – Belle: The Shape of Fear
- 2023/05 – Robyn Hood: Spawn of Nyarlathotep
- 2023/05 – Grimm Fairy Tales: Vol. 2 #72
- 2023/06 – Grimm Spotlight: Masumi
- 2023/06 – Grimm Spotlight: Lovecraft's Legacy
- 2023/06 – Grimm Myths & Legends Quarterly: Dagon
- 2023/06 – Gretel: Mortal Vices
- 2023/06 – Grimm Fairy Tales: Vol. 2 #73
- 2023/07 – Cinderella vs The Queen of Hearts #3
- 2023/07 – Grimm Fairy Tales 2023 Swimsuit Special
- 2023/07 – Robyn Hood Annual: Invasion
- 2023/07 – Van Helsing: Hell to Pay
- 2023/07 – Belle: Ancient Instincts
- 2023/07 – Grimm Fairy Tales: Vol. 2 #74
- 2023/08 - Grimm Universe Presents Quarterly: Sleeping Beauty - Nightmare Queen
- 2023/08 - Oz: Kingdom of the Lost #1
- 2023/08 – Keys of Cthulhu
- 2023/08 – Robyn Hood #100
- 2023/08 – Grimm Spotlight: Zodiac vs Hydra
- 2023/08 – Grimm Fairy Tales: Vol. 2 #75
- 2023/09 – Van Helsing: The Horror Beneath
- 2023/09 - Necronomicon
- 2023/09 - Sherlock Holmes
- 2023/09 – Belle: Cursed
- 2023/10 – Grimm Fairy Tales: Vol. 2 #76
- 2023/10 - Oz: Kingdom of the Lost #2
- 2023/10 – Robyn Hood: Dark Shaman
- 2023/10 – Grimm Tales of Terror Quarterly: 2023 Halloween Special
- 2023/10 - Wonderland Annual: Out of Time
- 2023/11 - Grimm Fairy Tales: Vol. 2 #77
- 2023/11 – Lovecraft: The Call of Cthulu
- 2023/11 - Grimm Fairy Tales 2023 Armed Forces Edition
- 2023/11 – Van Helsing: The Syndicate
- 2023/11 - Wonderland: Child of Madness #1
- 2023/12 - Grimm Fairy Tales: Vol. 2 #78
- 2023/12 - Grimm Fairy Tales 2023 Holiday Pinup Special
- 2023/12 - Grimm Universe Presents Quarterly: 2023 Holiday Special
- 2023/12 - Belle Annual: Apex Predator
- 2023/12 – Hydra
- 2023/12 – Belle: House of Glass Slippers
- 2023/12 - Wonderland: Child of Madness #2

=== 2024 ===
- 2024/01 – Robyn Hood: Blood in the Water
- 2024/01 – Gretel: Dark Impulses
- 2024/01 - Van Helsing: Vampire Hunter #1
- 2024/01 - Grimm Fairy Tales Annual: The Last Dream
- 2024/01 - Grimm Fairy Tales: Vol. 2 #79
- 2024/01 - Cinderella: Princess of Death
- 2024/01 - Holmes & Houdini #1
- 2024/01 - Oz: Kingdom of the Lost #3
- 2024/01 - Grimm Fairy Tales: Vol. 2 #80
- 2024/02 - Wonderland: Child of Madness #3
- 2024/02 - Myst: Dragon's Guard
- 2024/02 - Van Helsing: Bonded by Blood
- 2024/02 - Grimm Fairy Tales: 2024 Valentine's Day Lingerie Pinup Special
- 2024/02 - Fairy Tale Team-Up: Robyn Hood & Belle the Beast Hunter
- 2024/02 - Van Helsing: Bride of the Night
- 2024/02 - Holmes & Houdini #2
- 2024/02 - Van Helsing: Vampire Hunter #2
- 2024/02 - Grimm Fairy Tales: Vol. 2 #81
- 2024/03 - Holmes & Houdini #3
- 2024/03 - Van Helsing: Vampire Hunter #3
- 2024/03 - Grimm Fairy Tales: Vol. 2 #82
- 2024/04 - Cinderella: Murder for All Seasons
- 2024/04 - Fairy Tale Team-Up: Robyn Hood & Gretel
- 2024/04 - Oz: Fall of the Emerald City #1
- 2024/04 - Grimm Fairy Tales: Vol. 2 #83
- 2024/04 - Grimm Fairy Tales: 2024 May the 4th Cosplay Special
- 2024/05 - Oz: Fall of the Emerald City #2
- 2024/05 - Grimm Fairy Tales: Vol. 2 #84
- 2024/06 - Fairy Tale Team-Up: Robyn Hood & Van Helsing
- 2024/06 - Oz: Fall of the Emerald City #3
- 2024/06 - Grimm Fairy Tales: Vol. 2 #85
- 2024/07 - Grimm Fairy Tales 2024 Swimsuit Special
- 2024/07 - Wonderland: Return to Madness #1
- 2024/07 - Van Helsing: Hexed
- 2024/07 - Man Goat & The Bunnyman: Beware of Pigman #1
- 2024/07 - Grimm Fairy Tales: Vol. 2 #86
- 2024/08 - Fairy Tale Team-Up: Robyn Hood & Jasmine
- 2024/08 - Wonderland: Return to Madness #2
- 2024/08 - Man Goat & The Bunnyman: Beware of Pigman #2
- 2024/08 - Grimm Fairy Tales: Vol. 2 #87
- 2024/09 - Wonderland: Return to Madness #3
- 2024/09 - Holmes & Houdini: The Curse of Moriarty
- 2024/09 - Man Goat & The Bunnyman: Beware of Pigman #3
- 2024/09 - Grimm Fairy Tales: Vol. 2 #88
- 2024/10 - Fairy Tale Team-Up: Robyn Hood & Mystere
- 2024/10 – Grimm Fairy Tales 2024 Halloween - Cinderella's Monster Mash
- 2024/10 - Grimm Fairy Tales: Vol. 2 #89
- 2024/11 – Belle: Shadow of the Rose
- 2024/11 - Grimm Fairy Tales: Vol. 2 #90
- 2024/12 - Grimm Tales of Terror 2024 Holiday Special
- 2024/12 - Fairy Tale Team-Up: Robyn Hood & Red Agent

=== 2025 ===
- 2025/01 - Terror & Fury: Rise of the Night #1
- 2025/01 - Grimm Fairy Tales: Vol. 2 #91
- 2025/01 - Grimm Tales of Terror: Vol. 5 #1
- 2025/01 - Grimm Fairy Tales: Vol. 2 #92
- 2025/02 - Terror & Fury: Rise of the Night #2
- 2025/02 - Grimm Tales of Terror: Vol. 5 #2
- 2025/02 - Grimm Fairy Tales: Vol. 2 #93
- 2025/03 - Grimm Tales of Terror: Vol. 5 #3
- 2025/03 - Terror & Fury: Rise of the Night #3
- 2025/03 - Grimm Fairy Tales 20th Anniversary 2025 Pinup Special
- 2025/03 - Grimm Fairy Tales: Vol. 2 #94
- 2025/04 - Grimm Tales of Terror: Vol. 5 #4
- 2025/04 - Grimm Fairy Tales: Vol. 2 #95
- 2025/04 - Killer Kobra: The Hunt Begins #1
- 2025/04 - Grimm Fairy Tales: Once Upon the End of Time
- 2025/04 - Grimm Fairy Tales: Alice in Zombieland
- 2025/04 - Zenescope Legends - Spring Edition 2025
- 2025/05 - Grimm Tales of Terror: Vol. 5 #5
- 2025/05 - Zenescope Myths & Monsters - Spring Edition 2025
- 2025/05 - Grimm Fairy Tales: Vol. 2 #96
- 2025/05 - Killer Kobra: The Hunt Begins #2
- 2025/06 - Grimm Tales of Terror: Vol. 5 #6
- 2025/06 - Grimm Fairy Tales: Vol. 2 #97
- 2025/06 - Zenescope Legends - Summer Edition 2025
- 2025/06 - Killer Kobra: The Hunt Begins #3
- 2025/07 - Neverland: Sands of Eternity
- 2025/07 - Grimm Fairy Tales 2025 Swimsuit Edition
- 2025/07 - Grimm Tales of Terror: Vol. 2 #7
- 2025/07 - Grimm Fairy Tales: Vol. 2 #98
- 2025/08 - Grimm Tales of Terror: Vol. 2 #8
- 2025/08 – Robyn Hood: The Infinite War
- 2025/09 - Oz: The Tablet of Destinies
- 2025/09 - Grimm Fairy Tales: Vol. 2 #99
- 2025/09 - Grimm Tales of Terror: Vol. 5 #9
- 2025/09 - Zenescope Legends - Fall Edition 2025
- 2025/09 - Myst: The Forgotten Hour
- 2025/09 - Grimm Fairy Tales: Vol. 2 #100
- 2025/10 - Grimm Tales of Terror: Vol. 5 #10
- 2025/10 - Grimm Fairy Tales 2025 Halloween Pinup Special
- 2025/10 - Zenescope Myths & Monsters - Fall Edition 2025
- 2025/11 - King Dracula #1
- 2025/11 - Grimm Tales of Terror: Vol. 5 #11
- 2025/12 - Grimm Fairy Tales 2025 Holiday Pinup Edition
- 2025/12 - Grimm Tales of Terror: Vol. 5 #12

=== 2026 ===
- 2026/01 - King Dracula #2
- 2026/01 - Van Helsing: Throne of Blood
- 2026/01 - Grimm Fairy Tales: Vol. 3 #1
- 2026/02 - Robyn Hood: Shadow Target
- 2026/02 - Grimm Tales of Terror: Vol. 5 #13
- 2026/03 - Grimm Fairy Tales: Vol. 3 #2
- 2026/03 - King Dracula #3
- 2026/03 - Zenescope Myths & Monsters - Winter 2026 Edition
- 2026/03 - Grimm Fairy Tales 2026 Cosplay Pinup Special
- 2026/04 - Grimm Fairy Tales: Vol. 3 #3
- 2026/05 - King Dracula #4
- 2026/06 - Grimm Fairy Tales 2026 Dark Circus Cosplay Pinup Special
- 2026/06 - Grimm Fairy Tales: Vol. 3 #4
- 2026/08 - Grimm Fairy Tales Presents 2026 Swimsuit Pinup Special
- 2026/10 - Van Helsing Annual 2026: Blood Ties
- 2026/10 - Jynx & Snitches: The Great Revenge #1
- 2026/10 - Zenescope 2026 Zombie Pinup Special
- 2026/10 - Grimm Fairy Tales: Vol. 3 #5
- 2026/11 - Jynx & Snitches: The Great Revenge #2
- 2026/11 - Grimm Fairy Tales: Vol. 3 #6
