= Don't Cry Wolf =

Don't Cry Wolf may refer to:

- Don't Cry Wolf (album), a 1986 album by London
- Don't Cry Wolf (film), a 2003 Swedish comedy film
- "Don't Cry Wolf", a 1977 song by the Damned from the album Music for Pleasure (The Damned album)
- "Don't Cry Wolf", a 1991 song by Samantha Fox from the album Just One Night (Samantha Fox album)

== See also ==
- Cry Wolf (disambiguation)
