= The Boy Who Cried Werewolf =

The Boy Who Cried Werewolf may refer to:

- The Boy Who Cried Werewolf (1973 film), a 1973 film directed by Nathan H. Juran
- The Boy Who Cried Werewolf (2010 film), a 2010 Nickelodeon telemovie
- 'The Boy Who Cried Werewolf', Season 1 Episode 8 Malcolm & Eddie (1996 TV Series)
- 'The Boy Who Cried Werewolf', Movie Macabre (1981 TV Series)
- 'The Boy Who Cried Werewolf', Season 1 Episode 3 Werewolf (TV series) 1987
- 'The Boy Who Cried Werewolf', Season 3 Episode 5 Svengoolie (1995 TV Series)

== See also ==
- The Boy Who Cried Wolf
- Cry Wolf (disambiguation)
