= Zenescope Entertainment =

American comic book and graphic novel publisher

- Founded: 2005
- Founder: Joe Brusha and Ralph Tedesco
- Country of origin: United States
- Headquarters location: Horsham, Pennsylvania
- Distribution: Diamond Book Distributors (books)
- Publication types: Comic books, graphic novels
- Fiction genres: Horror, action, and fantasy
- Imprints: Silver Dragon
- Official website: www.zenescope.com

Zenescope Entertainment is a comic book and graphic novel publisher headquartered in Horsham, Pennsylvania, United States, cofounded by Joe Brusha and Ralph Tedesco in 2005. Zenescope publishes full-color action, fantasy and horror titles.

Under the Silver Dragon imprint, Zenescope publishes all-ages and educational titles, partnering with companies like Discovery Channel and History Channel to develop content.

== History ==
Originally teamed up to write and develop screenplays, Joe Brusha and Ralph Tedesco realized that comic books and graphic novels followed the same process. An avid comic book reader, Brusha believed that comic books and graphic novels would become part of mainstream America, and wanted to help that process. They began writing and assembling the creative team for their flagship title Grimm Fairy Tales and published the first issue in June 2005. In 2006, Brusha and Tedesco partnered with writer Raven Gregory (known for his series The Gift) to begin work on the Return to Wonderland series, released in 2007.

== List of Zenescope Entertainment titles ==
=== 0–9 ===
- 1000 Ways to Die (February 2012, based on the Spike television series of the same title)
- 1001 Arabian Nights: The Adventures of Sinbad #0–13 (April 2008 – October 2010, retitled Sinbad from #10)

=== A ===
- Agon #1 (March 2010)
- Aliens vs. Zombies #1–5 (July–December 2015)
- All Guts, No Glory #1–3 (January–April 2022)
- Amerikan Freak (October 2007)
- Angel Falling (August 2013)

=== B ===
- B.A.R. Maid #1–3 (January–May 2014)
- The Black Knight #1–5 (October 2018 – March 2019)
- The Black Sable #1–6 (September 2017 – June 2018)
- Brimstone #1–7 (May 2011 – February 2012)

=== C ===
- Charmed:
  - Charmed: Season 9 #0–24 (June 2010 – October 2012)
  - Charmed: Season 10 #1–20 (October 2014 – September 2016)
- The Chronicles of Dr. Herbert West #1–6 (September 2008 – January 2009)
- Cinderella: Serial Killer Princess #1–4 (December 2016 – April 2017)
- Cinderella Annual: Bloody X-Mas (December 2020)
- Conspiracy v1 #1–5 (November 2018 – May 2019)
- Conspiracy v2 #1–5 (February 2020 – October 2020)
  - Area 51 (February 2020)
  - Alien Abductions (March 2020)
  - Men in Black (August 2020)
  - Black Knight Satellite (September 2020)
  - Planet X (October 2020)
- The Courier: From the Ashes #1–5 (April–September 2017)
- The Courier: Liberty and Death #1–3 (January–March 2021)

=== D ===
- The Dark One: Age of Darkness (May 2014)
- Death Force #1–6 (May–November 2016)
- Devil's Road (April 2020)
- Dragonsblood: Legend of Sigurd #1–4 (May–August 2019)

=== E ===
- Escape from Monster Island #1–6 (February–July 2016)
- E.V.I.L. Heroes #1–6 (August 2016 – March 2017)

=== F ===
- Final Destination: Spring Break #1–5 (March 2006 – April 2007)
- Fly #1–5 (June–October 2011)
- Fly: The Fall #1–5 (November 2012 – March 2013)

=== G ===
- Gretel #1–5 (March–July 2019)
- Grimm Fairy Tales:
  - Volume 1 #1–125 + #0 (June 2005 – August 2016, May 2014)
  - Volume 2 #1–67 (December 2016 – present)
  - The Piper #1–4 (March–July 2008)
  - Myths & Legends #1–25 (February 2011 – February 2013)
  - Steampunk #1–2 (February–April 2016)
  - Apocalypse #1–5 (August 2016 – February 2017)
  - Genesis: Heroes Reborn (October 2016)
  - Genesis: Heroes Rising (November 2016)
  - Steampunk Alice in Wonderland #1 (February 2017)
  - Dance of the Dead #1–6 (October 2017 – May 2018)
- Grimm Fairy Tales Presents:
  - Return to Wonderland #0–6 (May 2007 – February 2008)
  - Beyond Wonderland #0–6 (May 2008 – April 2009)
  - Escape from Wonderland #0–6 (June 2009 – April 2010)
  - Neverland #1–7 (February 2010 – February 2011)
  - Neverland: Hook #1–5 (November 2011 – May 2012)
  - Alice in Wonderland #1–6 (January–May 2012)
  - Call of Wonderland #1–4 (May–September 2012)
  - Madness of Wonderland #1–4 (February–May 2013)
  - Vampires: The Eternal #1–3 (April–June 2013)
  - Werewolves: The Hunger #1–3 (May–July 2013)
  - Wounded Warriors Special (July 2013)
  - Zombies: The Cursed #1–3 (July–September 2013)
  - Ascension #1–5 (February–June 2014)
  - Warlord of Oz #1–6 (May–October 2014)
  - White Queen #1–3 (February–April 2015)
  - Snow White vs. Snow White #1–2 (June–July 2016)

=== H ===
- Hellchild: Blood Money #1–4 (April–July 2019)
- Hellchild: Inferno (March 2018)
- Hellchild: The Unholy #1–5 (November 2016 – April 2017)
- Hit List #1–5 (September 2013 – February 2014)
- Hollywood Zombie Apocalypse #1–2 (November 2014 – January 2015)

=== I ===
- Inferno: Resurrection #1–5 (January–October 2016)
- Irresistible #1–4 (July–October 2012)

=== J ===
- Jasmine: Crown of Kings #1–5 (May–September 2018)
- Jindai #1–5 (October 2005 – February 2006)
- The Jungle Book 2016 Holiday Special (December 2016)
- Jurassic Strike Force 5:
  - Volume 1 #0–5 + FCDB issue (December 2011 – April 2013)
  - Volume 2 FCBD One-Shot (May 2015)
- Just Princesses (August 2016)

=== L ===
- The Living Corpse:
  - The Living Corpse #1/2 (July 2007)
  - The Living Corpse #0–6 (November 2007 – October 2008)
  - The Living Corpse Annual – Guest Starring Hack/Slash #1 (April 2009)

=== M ===
- Mainstream #1–5 (April–September 2018)
- Man Goat and the Bunnyman #1–3 (April–July 2021)
- Man Goat and the Bunnyman: Green Eggs and Blam! #1–3 (July–September 2022)
- Merc: Broken World #1–2 (January–April 2010)
- Monster Hunter's Survival Guide:
  - The Monster Hunters' Survival Guide #1–5 (October 2010 – May 2011)
  - The Monster Hunters' Survival Guide Case Files: Chupacabra (July 2012)
  - The Monster Hunters' Survival Guide Case Files: Sasquatch (July 2011)
  - The Monster Hunters' Survival Guide Case Files: Wendigo (August 2018)
- Monster Planet #1–5 (October 2019 – April 2020)
- The Musketeers #1–5 (February–July 2018)
- Mystere #1–5 (September 2019 – January 2020)
- Myths and Legends Quarterly #1–10 (October 2020 – present)

=== N ===
- Neverland:
  - Neverland: Return of Hook (November 2017)
  - Neverland Annual: Dark Alliance (May 2021)
- No Quarter #0 (February 2009)

=== O ===
- Oz: Heart of Magic #1–5 (April–September 2019)
- Oz: Reign of the Witch Queen #1–6 (April–November 2015)
- Oz: Return of the Wicked Witch #1–3 (2022)
- Oz: The Wizard (May 2018)
- Oz Annual: Dominion of Ozmo (April 2022)
- Oz Annual: Patchwork Girl (June 2021)

=== P ===
- Paradise Court #1–5 (August–November 2018)
- Peek-A-Boo #1–5 (March–July 2018)
- Possessive #1–3 (July–October 2021)

=== R ===
- Red Agent #1–5 (January–June 2016)
- Red Agent: The Human Order #1–9 (November 2016 – July 2017)
- Red Agent: The Island of Dr. Moreau #1–5 (January–June 2020)
- Revenge of Wonderland #1–6 (July 2018 – January 2019)
- Ripley's Believe It or Not! #1–2 (October–November 2018 )
- Rise of the Djinn #1–3 (October 2021 – March 2022)
- Robyn Hood:
  - Robyn Hood vs. Red Riding Hood (April 2013)
  - Robyn Hood: Wanted #1–5 (May–October 2013)
  - Robyn Hood: The Hunt #1–6 (August–December 2017)
  - Robyn Hood: Vigilante #1–6 (November 2019 – April 2020)
  - Robyn Hood: Voodoo Dawn (May 2021)

=== S ===
- Salem's Daughter #0–5 (April 2009 – August 2010)
- Salem's Daughter: The Haunting #1–5 (August 2011 – March 2012)
- Satan's Hollow #1–6 (March–September 2016)
- Sci-Fi and Fantasy Illustrated: The Perfect Mate (February 2010)
- Sci-Fi and Fantasy Illustrated: Red Banned (July 2010)
- Sci-Fi and Fantasy Illustrated: Virtual Life (2017)
- Screwed #1–6 (June–November 2013)
- Se7en #1–7 (September 2006 – October 2007, based on the 1995 film Seven)
- Shang #1–3 (March–August 2020)
- Sins of the Fallen #1–4 (October 2005 – January 2006)
- Sleepy Hollow #1–4 (October 2012 – January 2013)
- Spirit Hunters #1–12 (November 2016 – July 2018)
- Stingers #1–5 (March 2009 – March 2010)
- The Straw Men #1–3 (July–November 2008 based on the 2002 novel by Michael Marshall)

=== T ===
- Tales from Neverland #1–3 (May–August 2011)
- Tales from Oz #1–6 (January 2014 – January 2015)
- Tales from Wonderland:
  - Tales from Wonderland: Alice (June 2008)
  - Tales from Wonderland: The Cheshire Cat (June 2009)
  - Tales from Wonderland: Mad Hatter #1–2 (May 2008 – October 2009)
  - Tales from Wonderland: Queen of Hearts (April 2008)
  - Tales from Wonderland: Queen of Hearts vs. Mad Hatter (August 2010)
  - Tales from Wonderland: The Red Queen (June 2009)
  - Tales from Wonderland: The Red Rose (July 2010)
  - Tales from Wonderland: Tweedledee and Tweedledum (September 2009)
  - Tales from Wonderland: The White Knight (May 2010)
- Terminal Alice (August 2011)
- The Theater #1–5 (September 2011 – April 2012)

=== U ===
- Unbound #1–5 (October 2019 – March 2020)

=== V ===
- Vessel #1–3 (2017)
- Vikings: Blood Legacy (2013), a prequel to the History Channel television series

=== W ===
- Wake the F#ck Up #1 (November 2012)
- The Waking #1–4 (February–May 2010)
- The Waking: Dreams End #1–4 (April–September 2012)
- The Watcher #1–3 (August–October 2019)
- Whore (September 2012)
- Willow Creek #0–1 (February–April 2008)
- Wonderland:
  - Wonderland: Age of Darkness #1 (June 2014)
  - Wonderland: Asylum #1–5 (January–May 2014)
  - Wonderland: Birth of Madness (May 2017)
  - Wonderland: Clash of Queens #1–5 (February–June 2014)
  - Wonderland: Down the Rabbit Hole #1–5 (May–October 2013)
  - Wonderland: Through the Looking Glass #1–5 (October 2013 – January 2014)
  - Wonderland Annual: Reign of Darkness (September 2021)

=== Z ===
- Zodiac #1–3 (February–April 2019)
- Zombies vs. Cheerleaders:
  - Zombies vs. Cheerleaders Halloween Special (October 2014)
  - Zombies vs. Cheerleaders St. Patty's Day Special (March 2015)
  - Zombies vs. Cheerleaders 2015 Halloween Special (October 2015)

== Adaptations of original works ==
=== Grimm Fairy Tales: The Animated Series ===
After meeting with director Jon Schnepp in 2011 at San Diego Comic-Con, the group collaborated on creating Grimm Fairy Tales: The Animated Series. Hoping to maintain creative control over the direction of the pilot, the group created a Kickstarter fundraiser in March 2012. On May 1 the Kickstarter exceeded its funding goal and production began. Featuring the voice talents of Lena Headey, Briana Evigan, Chris Hardwick, and Robert Forster, the pilot was shopped to potential networks. The company has hosted multiple advance screenings of the pilot for fans at conventions since October 2012.

=== Wonderland ===
By July 2012, Lionsgate Television emerged as the winner in a six-studio bidding war for TV rights to Zenescope's Wonderland series. Brian Robbins was attached to serve as an executive producer, with Tedesco and Brusha serving as co-executive producers.

=== The Piper ===
In 2011, Mandalay Vision acquired the film rights to The Piper, with Adam Alleca to adapt it for the screen.

== Licensed properties ==
In addition to their original titles, Zenescope publishes and develops licensed material for numerous clients, including CBS, Discovery Channel, History Channel, New Line Cinema, and many others. They began publishing the Charmed series in June 2010, picking up where the television series left off. Other adaptations of licensed material include graphic novels based on Se7en and Final Destination for New Line Cinema, and 1000 Ways To Die for SpikeTV.

=== History Channel ===
In October 2012, Zenescope partnered with The History Channel to release a companion graphic novelization, in two volumes, with their 12-hour event Mankind: The Story of All of Us.

In 2013, Zenescope partnered with The History Channel to create the free Vikings #1 (2013) comic book giveaway, based on the television show.

== See also ==
- Van Helsing (TV series)
