= The Girl Who Cried Wolf =

The Girl Who Cried Wolf may refer to:

- 'The Girl Who Cried Wolf', a season 8 episode of Beverly Hills, 90210
- 'The Girl Who Cried Wolf', an episode of Men in Trees
- Girl Who Cried Wolf, 2009 album by Sierra Swan
- 'The Girl Who Cried Wolf', a song by 5 seconds of summer

== See also ==
- The Boy Who Cried Wolf
