= Cry Wolf =

To cry wolf means to raise a false alarm, derived from the fable The Boy Who Cried Wolf.

Cry Wolf may also refer to:

== Music ==
- Cry Wolf (band), a heavy metal band
  - Cry Wolf (album), their first album
- "Cry Wolf" (A-ha song), a 1986 song
- "Cry Wolf" (Laura Branigan song), a 1987 song later covered by Stevie Nicks
- "Cry Wolf", a song by Cavo from the 2009 album Bright Nights Dark Days
- "Cry Wolf", a song by Venom from the 1983 album At War with Satan
- "Cry Wolf", a song by Lisa Germano from the 1994 album Geek the Girl
- "Cry Wolf", a song by Jonathan Thulin from the 2015 album Science Fiction
- “Cry Wolf”, a song by Friendly Fires from the 2019 album Inflorescent

== Film and television ==
- Cry Wolf (1947 film), starring Errol Flynn and Barbara Stanwyck
- Cry Wolf (1969 film), a British film produced by the Children's Film Foundation
- Cry Wolf (2005 film), starring Julian Morris and Lindy Booth
- Cry Wolf (American TV series), TV series based on the Danish series Ulven kommer
- Cry Wolf (Danish TV series), (Ulven kommer) 2020 TV series co-written by Kim Fupz Aakeson
- Cry Wolf (Swedish TV series) (Vargasommar), 2024 TV series
- "Cry Wolf" (The Professionals), 1983 television episode
- "Cry Wolf" (Thunderbirds episode), an episode of the television series Thunderbirds
- "Cry Wolf!", an episode of the television series Fireman Sam
- "Cry Wolf!", an episode of the television series The Raccoons

== Literature ==
- Cry Wolf (novel), a 1976 novel by Wilbur Smith
- Cry Wolf (2008 novel), a 2008 fantasy novel by Patricia Briggs
- Cry Wolf (2020 book), non-fiction book by Harold R. Johnson

== Video games ==
- "Cry Wolf", the last episode of the game The Wolf Among Us

== See also ==
- Cry Wolfe, an American television show
- Never Cry Wolf, 1963 autobiographical work by Farley Mowat
  - Never Cry Wolf (film), its film adaptation
- The Cry of the Wolf, 1990 novel by Melvin Burgess
- Don't Cry Wolf (disambiguation)
- The Boy Who Cried Werewolf (disambiguation), two films of the same name
