= Monster Hunter's Survival Guide =

The Monster Hunters Survival Guide is a comic book miniseries written by John Paul Russ, and illustrated by Shawn McCauley and Anthony Spay. It was published by Zenescope Entertainment in July 2011. A paperback was published on August 9 of the same year.

== Film adaptation ==
A feature film was announced in November 2011, produced by Simon Kinberg through his Genre Films banner. Dwayne Johnson was set to star in the film.
