= The Man Who Cried Wolf =

The Man Who Cried Wolf may refer to:

- A variant of The Boy Who Cried Wolf, fable by Aesop
- “The Man Who Cried Wolf”, by Robert Bloch
- The Man Who Cried Wolf (film), 1937 film
- 'The Man Who Cried Wolf', season 3, episode 4 of the 1990 TV series Zorro
- 'The Man Who Cried Wolf', season 1, episode 3 of Don't Call Me Charlie!, 1962

== See also ==
- The Old Man Who Cried Wolf, 1970 TV film
- The Man Who Cried, a 2000 Anglo-French drama film
