= Seven (comic book) =

Comic book edited by David Seidman and Ralph Tedesco

Publication information
- Format: Limited series
- No. of issues: 7

Seven (stylized as SE7EN) is a comic book edited by David Seidman and Ralph Tedesco. It was published as a hardcover edition by Zenescope Entertainment on January 15, 2008, and is based on the 1995 film of the same name directed by David Fincher. Zenescope acquired the license to adapt the film after building a strong relationship with New Line Cinema, the owner of the film.

== Publication history ==
The series, originally published in seven monthly issue series from September 2006 to October 2007, was collected in one hardcover volume in January 2008.

== Plot summary ==
In a departure from the film, which was told from the perspective of two homicide detectives from New York City, Somerset (played by Morgan Freeman) and Mills (played by Brad Pitt), the book Seven is told from the perspective of John Doe (the story's killer, portrayed on film by Kevin Spacey). Doe is attempting to use seven deadly sins to prove a point about the world.

== Prints ==
Each 32-page issue featured a different creative team and a different deadly sin:

Overview of issues of Seven
Date published	Issue	Title	Creative artists
September 2006	#1	Seven: Gluttony	Raven Gregory, Tommy Castillo, and David Seidman
October 2006	#2	Seven: Greed	Joe Brusha, Ralph Tedesco & Arcana Studio
February 2007	#3	Seven: Sloth	Mike Kalvoda & David Seidman
March 2007	#4	Seven: Lust	Christian Beranek, Adam Beranek and Steven Perkins
May 2007	#5	Seven: Pride	Whol, David Seidman, & J. Nobody
July 2007	#6	Seven: Envy	David W. Mack, Leif Jones & David Seidman
October 2007	#7	Seven: Wrath	Mike Kalvoda, Brett Weldele and David Seidman
