= The Three Snake-Leaves =

German fairy tale

Folk tale
- Name: The Three Snake-Leaves
- Also known as: Die drei Schlangenblätter
- Aarne–Thompson grouping: ATU 612
- Country: Germany
- Published in: Grimms' Fairy Tales

"The Three Snake-Leaves" (German: Die drei Schlangenblätter) is a German fairy tale collected by the Brothers Grimm, tale number 16. It is Aarne-Thompson type 612, "The Three Snake-Leaves".

== Synopsis ==
A poor man's son leaves home to avoid burdening his father. As the kingdom is at war, the young man joins the royal army, leading his comrades into conquering the enemy. As a reward for his valour in battle, the young man earns the king's favour.

The king has a daughter who has sworn to only marry on one unusual condition: if either she or her husband dies, the surviving spouse must be buried alive with the other. The princess's strange request has frightened away many suitors, but the young man falls in love with her anyway. When the young man vows to uphold the princess's request, the king gives him his blessing and the couple marries.

Sometime later, the princess dies of an illness and the widowed prince must fulfill his promise. On the day of his wife's funeral, the prince is sealed alive inside her crypt; on a nearby table are four candles, four loaves of bread, and four bottles of wine provided for the prince. As the prince's provisions run out and he waits to starve to death, a snake approaches the princess's corpse, and he kills it by chopping its body into three pieces. Another snake appears and places three magical leaves on the dead snake's wounds; the leaves put the snake's body parts back together and resurrect it. Both snakes then crawl out of the crypt, leaving behind the leaves. Placing the three snake-leaves on his wife's eyes and mouth, the prince brings her back to life. The couple then goes to the sealed door, banging and shouting loud enough for the king and the guards to let them out. Upon being released, the prince gives the snake-leaves to his servant, commanding him to carry them in case they are needed again.

As time passes, the resurrected princess has changed and no longer loves her husband. One day, the prince's wife and his servant accompany him on a sea voyage to visit his father. The princess falls in love with the skipper, and they plot to murder the prince so they can marry. As the prince is sleeping, the princess seizes him by the head and the skipper his legs, and the wicked lovers throw him overboard, drowning him. However, the prince's loyal servant has quietly witnessed the crime and rides a boat to fish out his master's body and restores him to life with the snake-leaves.

The prince and his servant row back to the kingdom ahead of the princess and the skipper and inform the king of the lovers' misdeed. Shocked by his daughter's actions, the king hides his son-in-law. When the princess returns, she lies that her husband had died on the way home and the skipper saved her, only for the king to reveal the resurrected prince. The princess begs her father for mercy, but he refuses on account of her killing the person she owed her life.

The king then has the princess and the skipper executed by placing them on a ship pierced with holes and they drown.

== Analysis ==
=== Motifs ===
Austrian consul Johann Georg von Hahn noted the motif of the resurrection by the herb or plant a snake brought to revive its mate echoes the Greek tale of Polyidus and Glaucus.

Professor Ulrich Marzolph indicated its parallel in Greek tradition, but also pointed that the motif of the animal reviving its mate with a plant can be found in the poem Eliduc by Marie de France.

Hans-Jörg Uther noted literary predecessors in the Indian Panchatantra, in Apollodorus and in Hyginus.

== See also ==
- Joseph (Genesis)
- Hans My Hedgehog
- Tale of Two Brothers
- Chariton
