= The Boy Who Cried Wolf =

Aesop's fable

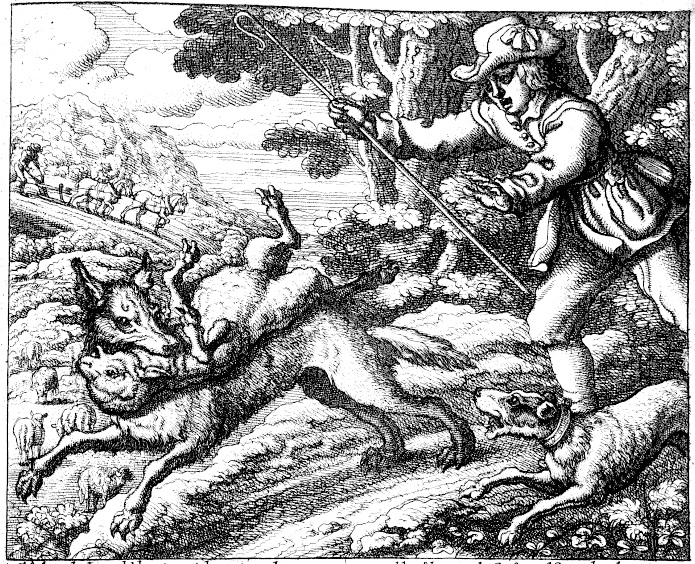
Francis Barlow's illustration of the fable, 1687

"The Boy Who Cried Wolf" is one of Aesop's Fables, numbered 210 in the Perry Index. From it is derived the English idiom "to cry wolf", defined as "to give a false alarm" in Brewer's Dictionary of Phrase and Fable and glossed by the Oxford English Dictionary as meaning to make false claims, resulting in subsequent true claims being disbelieved.

== Fable ==
The tale concerns a shepherd boy who repeatedly tricks villagers into believing a wolf is attacking his flock. When a real wolf appears and the boy cries for help, the villagers dismiss it as another false alarm, allowing the wolf to devour the sheep. In a later English-language poetic version of the fable, the wolf also eats the boy. This happens in John Hookham Frere's Fables for Five Years Old (1830), in William Ellery Leonard's Aesop & Hyssop (1912), and in Louis Untermeyer's 1965 poem.

The moral stated at the end of the Greek version is that "this shows how liars are rewarded: even if they tell the truth, no one believes them". It echoes a statement attributed to Aristotle by Diogenes Laërtius in his The Lives and Opinions of Eminent Philosophers, in which the sage was asked what those who tell lies gain by it and he answered "that when they speak truth they are not believed". William Caxton similarly closes his version with the remark that "men bileve not lyghtly hym whiche is knowen for a lyer".

== History ==
The story dates from Classical times, but, since it was recorded only in Greek and not translated into Latin until the 15th century, it only began to gain currency after it appeared in Heinrich Steinhöwel's collection of the fables and so spread through the rest of Europe. For this reason, there was no agreed title for the story. Caxton titles it "Of the child whiche kepte the sheep" (1484), Hieronymus Osius "The boy who lied" ("De mendace puero", 1574), Francis Barlow "Of the herd boy and the farmers" ("De pastoris puero et agricolis", 1687), Roger L'Estrange "A boy and false alarms" (1692), and George Fyler Townsend "The shepherd boy and the wolf" (1867). It was under the final title that Edward Hughes set the story as the first of ten Songs from Aesop's Fables for children's voices and piano, in a poetic version by Peter Westmore (1965). It also features as the second of "Aesop's Fables for narrator and band" (1999) by Scott Watson (b. 1964)

While educators have long used "The Boy Who Cried Wolf" as a cautionary tale against deceit, an experiment conducted in the early 21st century revealed that children exposed to the fable were more prone to lying. In contrast, those who read about George Washington and the cherry tree exhibited greater honesty. However, when dealing with the moral behaviour of adults, Samuel Croxall asks, referencing political alarmism, "when we are alarmed with imaginary dangers in respect of the public, till the cry grows quite stale and threadbare, how can it be expected we should know when to guard ourselves against real ones?"

Recent reports in a number of disciplines have linked the idiom derived from the fable, "crying wolf", with the phenomenon now described as alert (or alarm) fatigue, the state referred to by Croxall above.

== See also ==
- King You of Zhou, said to have toyed with his alarm beacons and later died in a rebellion when no nobles came to his aid
