= Bound (2015 film) =

2015 film directed by Jared Cohn

- Film poster
- Directed by: Jared Cohn
- Written by: Jared Cohn; Delondra Williams
- Produced by: Paul Bales; David Michael Latt
- Starring: Charisma Carpenter; Daniel Baldwin; Morgan Obenreder; Andy T. Tran; Hayley McLaughlin
- Cinematography: Laura Beth Love
- Edited by: James Kondelik
- Music by: Chris Cano
- Production company: The Asylum
- Distributed by: The Asylum
- Release date: January 9, 2015 (United States)
- Running time: 91 minutes
- Country: United States
- Language: English
- Budget: $1.13 million

Bound is a 2015 American erotic thriller film written and directed by Jared Cohn and starring Charisma Carpenter and Daniel Baldwin. It was produced by The Asylum.

== Plot ==
Michelle Mulan, an attractive woman in her forties, is a real estate broker who has recently been promoted at a failing firm. Although she is fully qualified for her new position, she was promoted because of her father, Walter's, status as chairman. While other executives want to sell the firm, she thinks it would be more of an advantage for her father's company to merge with a larger firm.

Despite unfulfilled sexual desires, Michelle does not cheat on her boyfriend George. As a single mother, she struggles to raise her teenage daughter, Dara, who wants more freedom in her life. Michelle takes Dara to a local restaurant dinner one evening, where she meets a man named Ryan Black, 15 years younger than she, who becomes enamoured with her. After dropping Dara off at home, Michelle returns to the restaurant, where Ryan tries to seduce her. She fends him off, but accepts his telephone number. Although, initially, she decides not to meet him, but the next day, after the merger is authorized, she does meet with him. After rejecting a marriage proposal from George, Michelle goes out with Ryan. On their date, he introduces her to the world of BDSM, after which Michelle cheats on George. After breaking up with George, Michelle begins to date Ryan, easily giving in to his dominating personality.

Falling in love, Michelle begins to call Ryan her "master" and refers to herself as a "messy whore." At a benefit dinner, Ryan begins to insult Michelle's client, Jesse Aaron, and to operate a vibrator egg she is wearing while she is with Jesse. Still, Michelle manages to get Jesse to consider a merger.

Michelle decides to learn more about being dominated and quickly finds that she enjoys submitting to Ryan's will. She learns that Ryan has a criminal record. She continues to try to negotiate a merger deal with Jesse Aaron in order to save her father's firm and continues to see Ryan, surrendering to him completely, while learning more and more about the submissive lifestyle. Along the way, she also learns how to become a dominant, and a woman at a BDSM club warns her that Ryan is a predator.

Unknown to her, Ryan also rapes Dara and has made her a submissive. Seeing this, Michelle finally throws off Ryan's bonds and uses her new-found sexual prowess to take control of her life. Ryan assaults her when she confronts him at his loft about his grooming and rape of Dara, but Michelle knocks him unconscious with a camera tripod. She takes him to his private dungeon and binds him, turning him into her submissive. After torturing Ryan, Michelle turns him over to the police for raping her underage daughter.

With her newfound confidence, Michelle seals the deal with Jesse Aaron and the merger of Walter's company to Jesse's is successful which impresses Walter so much that he makes Michelle a full partner in the company. Afterward in the final scene, Michelle signs the paperwork in her office finalizing the business merger with Jesse's company... and then makes him her submissive.

== Cast ==
- Charisma Carpenter as Michelle Mulan
- Bryce Draper as Ryan Black
- Morgan Obenreder as Dara
- Daniel Baldwin as Walter Mulan
- Andy T. Tran as Lee
- Hayley McLaughlin as Alana
- Michael Monks as Preston
- Mark McClain Wilson as George
- Noel Arthur as Jesse Aaron
- Steffinnie Phrommany as Kori
