= Book of Shadows (Charmed) =

Fictional book of spells

- Charmed element
- Book of Shadows open at spell pages
- Publisher: Spelling Television
- First appearance: Something Wicca This Way Comes
- Created by: Constance M. Burge
- Genre: Magic

In-universe information
- Type: Family heirloom Book of spells
- Owners: Charmed Ones
- Function: A collection of spells and magical lore from previous family generations
- Traits and abilities: Can detect evil
- Affiliation: Piper Halliwell; Phoebe Halliwell; Paige Matthews; Prue Halliwell (former)

The Book of Shadows, or simply the Book, is a book of witchcraft from the TV series Charmed. In the beginning, the book was created by Melinda Warren and was passed down the family to the Charmed Ones. This book contains spells, incantations, potions and information of the evil beings that their ancestors have once faced. They first find out that they were witches when Phoebe finds the Book of Shadows in their attic, at midnight on a full moon, and reads an incantation aloud. The Book of Shadows is enchanted. It can protect itself from any evil being who dares to touch it.

Outside of the television series, a Book of Shadows is considered to be a collection of magical and religious texts of Wicca and other Neopagan and witchcraft traditions, containing the core rituals, magical practices, ethics and philosophy of a practitioner. The Book of Shadows is a compendium of information on magical creatures/objects/forces of every variety, especially those that members of the Warren line had encountered, or believed would be useful to future generations. Within the realm of magical beings, it is considered to be the most complete book of magical information in existence.

In the television series Charmed, the Halliwell Sisters or The Charmed Ones own a powerful and coveted Book of Shadows that has been passed down through their family line. It contains spells, potions, and information on evil beings their ancestors have faced. The book has been enchanted to protect itself, causing it to move away from any evil being that attempts to touch it. It has a large triquetra set into its front cover, symbolizing the Power of Three.

== In-universe description ==
=== Background ===
The Charmed Ones' ancestor Melinda Warren began the Book of Shadows in the late 17th century. The year 1693 is inscribed on the book's first page, below the title, presumably to indicate when the book was created. When Melinda was burned at the stake in the Salem Witch Trials, she claimed that the magical powers of each successive generation of witches in the family would grow in strength, until the book reached three sisters known as The Charmed Ones, who would be "the most powerful witches the world has ever known". Melinda passed the book on to her daughter, Prudence, and it continued to be handed down from mother to daughter until it came to the Halliwell sisters in 1998.

The book has grown over the years with each witch who has possessed it, and by the late 1960s, it had about 100 pages. It continued to grow as The Charmed Ones added more information to it. Penny Halliwell brags in the season five episode, "Happily Ever After", that she created most of the good potion recipes in it. Patty Halliwell added text on Barbas, the Demon of Fear.

For many years, the Book was kept in the Manor's attic. Normally, all witches are supposed to keep their Book of Shadows in a specially protected altar room. The book has a different protection mechanism against evil. In several episodes, various effects resulted from an evil magical being tried to take the book for themselves, including: jumping off the stand in "Once Upon a Time" and "The Seven Year Witch", repelling the being away from the book in "Death Becomes Them", projecting a spherical shield around the Book in Death Becomes Them, burning the user's hands in "Imaginary Fiends", and so on. When the sisters' powers were unbound, evil beings could touch it, but they couldn't get it out of the Manor. However, by 2000, the sisters had become powerful enough that evil beings couldn't even touch it.

The Halliwell sisters occasionally wrote down their experiences after vanquishing a demon, which Billie mentions this when she studied the Book of Shadows in "Run Piper Run". The first, added by Phoebe, was a spell to banish the Woogyman. Phoebe added a detailed entry on Cole Turner, Belthazor's human form, and Prue added a spell to summon him in his demon form, as well as an animal conjuring spell. Later, at the end of the series, the sisters write in the book about their adventures and what become of their lives.

Leo Wyatt, Piper's husband, also added an entry titled "Tips for Future Whitelighters", fearing he may not live to see his sons grow up. The entry included information on whitelighter powers and advice on using them.

In the final episode, Piper tells her granddaughter that the book will one day be hers.

=== Appearances ===
In the Charmed series, the Book of Shadows is a large, green leather-bound book with an embossed red triquetra on the cover. The triquetra symbol has been known to change, usually according to some change in the sisters' powers or emotional state. The book is somewhat worn due to its three centuries of use, but it is almost completely intact, with the exception of the page on how to relinquish one's own powers, which The Charmed Ones tore out and burned after they nearly lost their powers to a warlock in the season one episode "Wicca Envy".

=== Powers, abilities and uses ===
- Can be used as a means of communicating with Grams, their grandmother, and other ancestors.
- Identifies and protects itself from evil in the form of a magical barrier.
- Can keep itself within the Manor, unless otherwise removed by one of The Charmed Ones or their family.
- Can have its spells reversed if they are read backwards.
- Cannot be photocopied.

Due to its link with the Halliwells:

- It can lose its entire content if all the Halliwells' powers are stripped.
- Its spells will become their evil counterparts if the sisters turn evil.
- If the sisters are under emotional distress, its power to protect itself from evil is diminished.
- If the sisters use their powers against one another, the sisters will lose their powers and the triquetra on the front of the book will separate.

=== Related Books ===
==== The Grimoire ====
The Book of Shadows has an evil counterpart known as the Grimoire. The Grimoire is a large brown book with an unknown demonic symbol of an upside down pentagram and skull on the cover. The Grimoire's pages are said to be blackened by its evil. Much like the Book of Shadows, the Grimoire possesses the power to protect itself from its enemies or anything good.

The Grimoire's spells and incantations are written in Latin. It makes only a few appearances in the television series and Leo later orbs it, to rest under a mountain of rock in the West Andes, to prevent the coronation of another Source.

Bianca and her family of assassin witches possess a grimoire which contains their family's spells, although this is simply a grimoire and not the Grimoire. The book's cover in that episode had a symbol depicting two intertwined snakes. That book was sold on eBay in late 2007 and reached a final bid of $405.00.

In the episode Bride and Gloom, the Charmed Ones' Book of Shadows began to change itself into a grimoire when the girls were turned into warlocks under the influence of evil magic. For instance, good spells were replaced with evil spells.

=== Gypsy books ===
In the series, Gypsies and witches are sister traditions. Though never specifically stated to be so, Gypsy families also have their own versions of the Book of Shadows that is passed down to immediate family members. This was shown in the season five episode, "The Eyes Have It", wherein the Gypsy Eva finds her family spell book previously owned by her mother after her mother's death. Like traditional Books of Shadows, Gypsies' books contain spells and magical recipes.

== Critical reception ==
Pagan author Raymond Buckland said in his 2002 book, The Witch Book, that the Charmed Book of Shadows gave the show an air of authenticity and showed that the producers of the show seemed to at least know a little of what they were talking about when depicting wiccan practices. Judika Illes adds that the Charmed Book of Shadows describes the show's witches much in the same way as the real world Italian Benandanti traditions. She claims the show draws deeply on wiccan terminology and ritual (such as the witches' adding information to their Book of Shadows), but asserts that it is still a fantasy show. In The Book of Shadows: The Unofficial Charmed Companion, Ngaire E. Genge talks about the Charmed Book of Shadows in relationship to a modern wiccan Book of Shadows and the ancient grimoires of such notables as Abra-Melen the Mage and King Solomon. The author is more critical of Charmed's use of the book compared to real-world wiccans but adds, as Buckland did, that it is still a fantasy show.

Criticism has also been garnered for Charmed's Book of Shadows. Author Peg Aoli critically slammed the series' representation of witchcraft in an essay in Totally Charmed: Demons, Whitelighters and the Power of Three. Furthermore, other critics at The Witches Voice argue that Charmed's representation of witchcraft, including their Book of Shadows, creates "so many misconceptions" about Wicca in the modern world.

=== Fandom and replica Books of Shadows ===
Following The Charmed Ones' suit, fans worldwide began creating replicas of the Charmed Book of Shadows, when the series began in the 1990s. Like the famed book of the series, the replica versions continued to grow as fans created more and more pages. The most extensive replica source has 2,500 pages to date and is distributed digitally (see source list). Fan-made Book of Shadows have become an art form in itself, and many different people create these. Every artisan owns the rights to their own work, so many differences appear in each artist's re-creation of the pages. There is no one-copyright holder to this collective work, which has become a hobby, like scrapbooking.

== The Book of Shadows post-Charmed ==
After Charmed ended its run, the one prop from the series that everyone wanted was the Book of Shadows. There was good-natured discussion over several years concerning which of the long-time crew and cast members had the best claim to the book. The candidates finally narrowed down to Brad Kern, the series' showrunner for its entire run; and Holly Marie Combs, who played Piper Halliwell and was the only cast member to appear in every episode, including the unaired pilot.

Kern and Combs were supposed to share custody of the book, and agreed to alternate possession between the two of them, each getting the book for a year at a time. Most recently Combs, appearing on a Comic Con Panel, confirmed that although Kern and her did agree to share custody, Kern has not shared the book.
