= Kyra (Charmed) =

Fictional character from the American television supernatural drama Charmed

- Charmed character
- Charisma Carpenter as Kyra
- First appearance: "Cheaper by the Coven" (7.03)
- Last appearance: The Reason (10.20)
- Created by: Brad Kern
- Portrayed by: Charisma Carpenter

In-universe information
- Full name: Kyra
- Species: Human; Demon (formerly)
- Gender: Female
- Title: The Seer (former)
- Significant other: Zankou (ex-fling)
- Abilities: Precognition (former); Divination (former); Shimmering (former)

Kyra, (Note: Kyra is sometimes spelled as "Kira" by some media outlets. The spelling is also used in closed captioning.) also known by her title the Seer, is a fictional character from the American television supernatural drama Charmed, which aired on The WB Television Network (The WB) from 1998 to 2006. Kyra was created by executive producer Brad Kern and portrayed by actress Charisma Carpenter. Her original contract was a recurring role that included three episodes in the show's season seven. TV Guide reported the WB had considered promoting her to a series regular.

A demon characterized by her powers of divination and precognition, she eventually forms a friendship with Leo Wyatt (Brian Krause) and the Charmed Ones, specifically Phoebe Halliwell (Alyssa Milano), after expressing her desire to become human. Although she was killed by the demon Zankou (Oded Fehr) on the show, Kyra is transported through time by the witch Prue Halliwell in the comics, saving her. She makes further canonical appearances in the comic book series Charmed: Season 10. Her storylines focus on her involvement with Prue's new destiny, and her romantic relationship with the newly revived Benjamin Turner (the father of half-demon Cole Turner).

Carpenter characterized Kyra through her sex appeal. Media outlets compared the character to Carpenter's previous performance as Cordelia Chase on the supernatural dramas Buffy the Vampire Slayer and Angel. Kyra received primarily positive reviews from critics, who praised Carpenter's performance. The character was also positively received in retrospective reviews. On the other hand, Television Without Pity's Demian criticized Kyra as a carbon copy of Cordelia without any indicators of a unique identity.

== Appearances ==
=== Television ===
Kyra (Charisma Carpenter) is a demon who channels her powers of precognition and divination through the use of a magical pool. She can also "shimmer", a method of teleportation used by demons. Introduced in season seven, Kyra helps Leo Wyatt (Brian Krause) uncover the identity of a masked demon attacking his son Wyatt Halliwell. She later works with the half-demon Sirk (Zack Ward) on his plans to track down and kill all of his mortal relatives in order to seal his transformation as a full demon.

As a demon, Kyra cannot feel emotions, although she is curious about the world of mortals. Longing to experience the emotions she sees in her visions, she contacts the Elders (a council of whitelighters which governs the forces of good) to make a deal where she would trade her information on a then-unknown threat, the Avatars, if she is made human. The Avatars are a group of magical beings capable of warping reality who devote themselves to creating a world without good or evil. As word of Kyra's betrayal spreads across the Underworld, Leo is sent by the Avatars to save her and bring her to the Halliwell Manor during the negotiations. The Charmed Ones – Piper Halliwell (Holly Marie Combs), Phoebe Halliwell (Alyssa Milano), and Paige Matthews (Rose McGowan) – reluctantly agree to protect Kyra.

While at the manor, Kyra bonds with Phoebe over their shared power of premonition. To gain Phoebe's trust, she guides her and Lieutenant Darryl Morris (Dorian Gregory) to Inspector Sheridan (Jenya Lano), a member of the San Francisco Police Department who was placed into a coma by FBI agent Kyle Brody (Kerr Smith). Brody had sequestered Sheridan in a psychiatric hospital after she discovered Piper, Phoebe, and Paige were witches. After some encouragement, Kyra shares her premonition of the Avatars with Phoebe. Although the Avatars were predicted to be a threat, Kyra's vision shows Phoebe and her future daughter living in a utopia where demons no longer exist. After receiving the vision, Phoebe has a premonition that the demon Zankou (Oded Fehr) will vanquish Kyra. In order to prevent Kyra's death, Phoebe convinces the Elders to provide a spell to turn Kyra human. During this time, Kyra forces Leo to reveal his true identity as an Avatar. While Piper helps her to prepare for her new life as a mortal, Kyra reveals her real name and abandons her title as "the Seer". Zankou kills Kyra before she can be transformed into a mortal. Her death is a turning point for Piper and Phoebe as it pushes them to meet and help the Avatars build their new world.

=== Comics ===
Kyra appears in Charmed: Season 10, the canonical comic book continuation of the television series. Prue Halliwell summons Kyra from the past to better understand her new identity as the guardian of the Nexus of the All—a spiritual energy that forms the basis of all magic. While performing a ritual to enter Kyra's mind, Prue steals her powers of foresight to further understand herself and the All. As a reward for helping her, Prue turns Kyra into a mortal and gives her a soul. Despite being overjoyed at her transformation, Kyra is initially uncertain about her plans for the future.

Kyra decides to reconnect with Piper, Phoebe, and Paige and devote her life to doing good. She begins by helping the newly resurrected Benjamin Turner, the father of the half-human and half-demon Cole Turner, adjust to his new life. After spending time together, Kyra and Benjamin fall in love and begin a romantic relationship. Prue kidnaps Kyra, along with Benjamin and the archai (a magical being capable of opening portals through reality) Tyler Michaels. Kyra witnesses Prue perform a sacrificial ritual forcing Tyler to open portals in the sky that provide the Old Ones with access to the mortal world. Prue, while under the influence of the Old One Heremus, attacks Knox Academy, a school for magic, and turns its students and faculty into hosts for demons. Paige rescues Kyra, Benjamin, and Tyler. Following Prue's death and the closure of the portals, Benjamin and Kyra take over Knox Academy.

== Development ==
=== Casting and creation ===
Charisma Carpenter was initially scheduled for at least two episodes of Charmed; she later confirmed on her official website that Kyra would be a recurring character. Carpenter joked that she was surprised to be considered for such a minor part on the show. In an article for Today, reader Patrick Kelly cited Carpenter's appearances on Charmed as an indicator of her popularity among the 16- to 39-year-old male demographic. The Palm Beach Post's Kevin D. Thompson said Carpenter was one of the "guest-stars we can't wait to see" for the 2004–05 United States network television schedule.

Kyra was created as a separate character from the Seer, played by Debbi Morgan, who was featured as an antagonist in the show's fourth season. When discussing Kyra's introduction, a writer for The Jackson Sun also characterized her as a villain. Carpenter had previously played a seer named Cordelia Chase in the television show Angel. Although she did not personally identify as a "vision girl", Carpenter said she was often cast as a seer. In a 2019 Business Insider article, Jillian Selzer noted that Carpenter's casting on Charmed was not surprising given her involvement on other supernatural shows.

According to TV Guide's Kristin Veitch, representatives from The WB Television Network (The WB) issued a statement indicating the possibility of Kyra being promoted to star billing. Carpenter had been set to star in a mid-season replacement sitcom for United Paramount Network (UPN) called Like Cats and Dogs, but she was interested in doing more Charmed episodes if the pilot was not picked up the network. She said although she enjoyed working in the supernatural genre and viewed it as familiar territory, she was hesitant about committing to the show's demanding shooting schedule as it would take time away from raising her son.

=== Characterization ===
In an interview with Charmed Magazine, Carpenter described Kyra as having a similar sassiness as Cordelia Chase, but clarified Kyra was "totally evil and a lot sexier" than Cordelia. She identified sexuality as the defining aspect of Kyra's personality, referring to her as "overtly sexual, coy, and kitteny". While she viewed Cordelia as a "smartass", Carpenter defined Kyra as a "temptress" and a "jezebel", and her flirtatious banter with Leo as a part of her own agenda. She said her approach to Kyra was influenced by her revealing outfit, feeling that every woman on Charmed had to look and act "hot" and "notoriously sexy". Executive producer Brad Kern summed up the character as "a seductress and a real smartass".

Pat Shand, the writer of Charmed: Season 10, said he incorporated Kyra in the comic book series because he enjoyed her dialogue and Carpenter's performance; he wrote: "To write dialogue for a character played by Charisma is to hear Charisma in your head. Who would turn that down?". Shand commended Carpenter's ability to voice characters in "a very unique rhythm" and called the process of replicating that energy in the form of comics as "a blast" and "super easy" in comparison with the show's other characters.

When discussing the season's development, Shand said pairing Kyra and Prue Halliwell for a storyline was a "natural fit" since both characters were his favorites from the show. In interviews with the fansite CharmedComicFan, he explained Kyra was a central part of the season. Shand identified her as part of the "straight up plot" and "inextricable" from Prue's storylines in response to fans' concerns that she would be limited to a subplot. Although Prue never interacted with Kyra on the show, Shand said Prue had sifted through "all of the seers in all of the history to see who best tell her what's the deal" and chose Kyra.

== Critical reception ==
Critical response to Kyra was largely positive. The Seattle Post-Intelligence's Melanie McFarland praised Kyra as a "tasty demon seer". In a Charmed Magazine article, Tara Dilullo considered Carpenter to be the perfect person to play Kyra since she had "spent the better part of her career facing down the supernatural with a snark and a smile" as Cordelia Chase. Television Without Pity's Demain, however, had a more mixed response to Kyra. Although he enjoyed that Charmed hired an actor from a Joss Whedon show, he felt Carpenter was not given enough material and criticized her for playing the character too similar to Cordelia. Parodying Kyra's lack of a concrete identity, Demain referenced Kyra as "Charisma", "Cordelia", and "Cordelia Lite" in his episode recaps.

Kyra was also praised in retrospective reviews. SpoilerTV's Gavin Hetherington said Kyra was one of the season's high points, and felt the character could have been used more. Screen Rant's Amanda Bruce described her as "a fun addition to the show" and praised Carpenter's performance. Describing Kyra as the more memorable version of the two Seers, Hypable's Karen Rought praised the show for casting Carpenter; she wrote "how fitting is it that [Carpenter] landed this role after Cordelia Chase also had precognitive abilities". Movie Pilot's John Collins cited Carpenter as one of his favorite guest stars on Charmed.

In 2015, Pat Shand criticized the decision to kill Kyra and introduce the novice witch Billie Jenkins (Kaley Cuoco) in season eight. He described Kyra as a better alternative to Billie as a potential "fourth main character" or "non-Charmed One getting all that screen time" during the final season. In a Tumblr interview Shand wished that Kyra had received a spin-off with Cole Turner and Darryl Morris.
