= Phoebe Halliwell =

Fictional character from the American television series Charmed

- Charmed character
- First appearance: "Something Wicca This Way Comes" (1.01)
- Last appearance: The Reason (10.20)
- Created by: Constance M. Burge
- Portrayed by: Alyssa Milano; Lori Rom (unaired pilot); Frances Bay (old Phoebe); Samantha Goldstein (young Phoebe)

In-universe information
- Full name: Phoebe Halliwell
- Alias: Julie Bennett
- Species: Charmed One, Witch, Empath
- Gender: Female
- Occupation: Advice columnist
- Family: Patty Halliwell (mother; deceased); Victor Bennett (father); Prue Halliwell (oldest sister; deceased); Piper Halliwell (older sister); Paige Matthews (younger maternal half-sister)
- Spouses: Cole Turner (ex-husband; deceased); Dex Lawson (ex-husband); Coop Halliwell (husband; 2006–present)
- Children: Unborn son (with Cole; deceased); Prudence Johnna "PJ" Halliwell (comic book series); Parker Halliwell (comic book series); Peyton Halliwell (comic book series)
- Relatives: Charlotte Warren (ancestor; deceased); Melinda Warren (ancestor; deceased); Penny Halliwell (grandmother; deceased); Allen Halliwell (grandfather; deceased)
- Notable powers: Premonition; Levitation; Empathy

Phoebe Halliwell is a fictional character from the American television series Charmed, played by Alyssa Milano from October 7, 1998, until May 21, 2006. The character was originally played by Lori Rom in the unaired pilot episode. However, Rom quit the series, and a new pilot was filmed with Milano in the role of Phoebe. The character was created by Constance M. Burge and is based on Burge herself. Phoebe is introduced into Charmed as the youngest sister to Prue (Shannen Doherty) and Piper Halliwell (Holly Marie Combs). She is one of the original featured leads and, more specifically, a Charmed One – one of the most powerful witches of all time. Phoebe initially possesses the power of premonition, which enables her to see into the future and the past. To make up for initially only having a passive power, Phoebe develops martial arts skills in order to better assist her sisters when they fight evil beings. As the series progresses, she also gains the active powers of levitation and empathy.

Phoebe was originally portrayed as the "free-spirited", "carefree", and most rebellious sister. However, Phoebe's progression as a witch helps her become more responsible and grow as a person. She later becomes the middle sister from season four onwards, after Prue dies and the series introduces their younger half-sister Paige Matthews (Rose McGowan). Phoebe's various romantic relationships have been central to most of her storylines. Her longest on-screen relationship is with half-demon Cole Turner (Julian McMahon); they have a turbulent marriage in the fourth season, and in the fifth, following their divorce, she is compelled to vanquish him. In subsequent seasons, Phoebe has romantic relationships with her boss Jason Dean (Eric Dane), coworker Leslie St. Claire (Nick Lachey), and artist Dex Lawson (Jason Lewis). In the eighth and final season, she marries a cupid named Coop (Victor Webster).

The character was mostly well received by television critics, who praised Phoebe's comedic side and felt that Milano was a better fit for the role than Rom. They also commented on the outfits worn by Phoebe in the later seasons, with some critics describing them as "revealing and ridiculous costumes", "sexy" and "skimpy." Milano's portrayal of Phoebe earned her several awards and nominations; she was nominated for a Spacey Award, Nickelodeon Kids' Choice Award, and a Teen Choice Award. In 2007 and 2008, AOL TV ranked Phoebe at number seven on their list of the Top TV Witches. In addition to the television series, the character has also appeared in numerous expanded universe material, such as the Charmed novels and its comic book adaptation.

== Casting and development ==
In 1998, The WB began searching for a drama series, and looked to Spelling Television, which had produced the network's most successful series 7th Heaven, to create it. Expanding on the popularity of supernatural-themed dramas, the production company explored forms of mythology to find mythological characters they could focus on with contemporary storytelling. In order to create the series, Constance M. Burge was hired as the creator as she was under contract with 20th Century Fox and Spelling Television after conceiving the drama Savannah.

The character of Phoebe Halliwell was conceived by Burge, who wrote the pilot script for Charmed. The pilot script was based around three mismatched sisters who are initially based on Burge and her two older sisters, Laura and Edie Burge. Phoebe is based on Burge herself. On creating the Halliwell sisters, Burge stated "Phoebe was honestly the easiest. It just grew from within." Executive producer Brad Kern claimed Phoebe was written into the series as the classic younger sibling and stated that at the start of series Phoebe is "trying to find her own identity by living life large and not really having a care in the world."

When the series was in its first development stages, actress Lori Rom was cast in the role of Phoebe. Rom played the role in a 28-minute test pilot (the "unaired pilot" never aired on television) with which the series was picked up by The WB. Rom later pulled out from the series before a 45-minute version of the pilot could be filmed for proper network television, leaving the role of Phoebe vacant. Executive producer Aaron Spelling then turned to actress Alyssa Milano, who was previously cast in another television series produced by Spelling Television, Melrose Place. While Milano was in Hawaii shooting an episode for Fantasy Island, Spelling phoned Milano and asked her to consider joining the series. After receiving a copy of the original pilot and the script, five days later Milano began shooting the re-shot pilot episode.

== Appearances ==
=== Television ===
==== Season 1 ====
Phoebe enters the series as the youngest Halliwell sister. She was first portrayed by Lori Rom in the unaired pilot, which the role was later given and portrayed by Alyssa Milano in all of the show's aired 178 episodes. At the start of season one (1998–99), six months have passed since the death of her Grams, Penny Halliwell (Jennifer Rhodes). A jobless Phoebe returns from New York City and moves back to San Francisco into her family's Victorian Manor with her two sisters Prue (Shannen Doherty) and Piper (Holly Marie Combs). On the night of Phoebe's return, she finds a book called the Book of Shadows within the Manor's attic. After Phoebe unknowingly recites aloud what turns out to be an incantation from the book, the three sisters each receive a magical power and discover their destiny as The Charmed Ones – the most powerful good witches the world has ever known. Phoebe obtains the power to "see the future" which contrasts with her known reckless persona. Because of her free-spirited nature, Phoebe often brings conflict into the Halliwell Manor, more often with Prue during the first season — this is especially in regards to their witchcraft. Initially drawn apart due to Prue's speculation of Phoebe being the cause of her failed engagement to Roger (Matthew Ashford), the two sisters mend their relationship over the course of the season.

==== Season 2 ====
In season two (1999–2000), Phoebe is seen re-entering college and majoring in psychology. She continues to embrace her destiny as a witch and is noted by her sisters as being the best at writing new spells. In the absence of an active power, Phoebe becomes progressively adept at martial arts in order to better fight demons and warlocks. Throughout the season, Phoebe struggles to open herself up to love and attempts to find a love interest who can live up to her "ideal guy" as portrayed in her favorite in-verse movie, Kill It Before It Dies by the character Billy (Chris Payne Gilbert). In the season two finale, Phoebe and her sisters discover that the many attacks on their lives by evil beings have been orchestrated by a demonic force known as The Council.

==== Season 3 ====
In the show's third season (2000–01), Phoebe receives the active power of levitation and enters a relationship with charismatic District Attorney Cole Turner (Julian McMahon), who is actually the demon mercenary Belthazor that was sent by The Triad (who have replaced The Council) to get close to and kill The Charmed Ones. Upon this discovery, Phoebe struggles between her loyalty to her sisters and her love for Cole. After a tumultuous love affair, often deterred due to Cole's frequent struggle between good and evil, Phoebe manages to graduate from college. Phoebe and her sisters eventually learn that The Triad work for an even greater evil, The Source of All Evil who is the leader of the demonic realm known as The Underworld. In the season three finale, Phoebe ventures into The Underworld to save Cole from his dark side, while her sisters face dire consequences in the world above. Prue and Piper unwittingly expose themselves as witches to the world after being caught on camera by a local news crew fighting with The Source's personal assassin Shax. This results in Piper's catastrophic death in the arms of Prue, and Phoebe unable to help them. In order to save Piper's life, Prue orders Leo Wyatt (Brian Krause) to find Phoebe and pass on a deal to The Source to turn back time. The Source agrees, knowing that he plans to double cross her in the end as Phoebe will be immune to the time reset while in The Underworld. Time is reversed to the sisters' first encounter with Shax, however Phoebe no longer answers when Prue calls for help, as she was never sent back. The season ends on a cliffhanger with Piper and Prue left for dead after losing in the fight against Shax. Meanwhile, Phoebe remains trapped in The Underworld.

==== Season 4 ====
The opening episode of the fourth season (2001–02), "Charmed Again (Part 1)", reveals that Phoebe was rescued from The Underworld by Leo and Cole. However, because of this they arrived too late and were only able to heal Piper of her injuries from the season three finale. Prue's injuries from Shax were too severe and was unable to be saved. Later in the episode, while attending Prue's funeral, Phoebe meets Paige Matthews (Rose McGowan) and receives a premonition of the woman being attacked by Shax. This incident leads to Phoebe and Piper discovering that Paige is their younger half-sister. By the end of the season premiere, Paige helps to restore the Power of Three and avenge Prue's death in vanquishing her murderer Shax. During this season, Phoebe finds herself forced into the role of the middle sister as she attempts to play mediator between Piper and Paige, much like Piper was once for her and Prue. Alongside continuing her Charmed role, Phoebe receives a marriage proposal from Cole, accepting after he becomes stripped of his demon half. Phoebe eventually pens the spell to vanquish The Source, whom escapes a final vanquish by possessing the now human Cole. For the remainder of the season, Phoebe plans to marry Cole unaware that he has become the new Source of All Evil and ruler of The Underworld. After being tricked by Cole and The Seer (Debbie Morgan) into participating in a dark marriage ceremony, Phoebe lands a job as an advice columnist for the newspaper The Bay Mirror. Soon after she discovers that she is pregnant and subsequently chooses to join Cole as his queen in The Underworld.

As season four draws to a close, Phoebe is forced to choose between her husband and her sisters. She mournfully sides with her sisters to vanquish Cole. Later, her unborn child is magically stolen by The Seer who claims that the child is rightfully hers and was never Phoebe's. About to be sacrificed as human offerings during The Seer's coronation as the new Source, Phoebe and her sisters tap into "The Power of Three" and vanquish The Seer and the entire Underworld council. In the season finale, the Angel of Destiny (Dakin Matthews) visits and gives the sisters an offer to live a normal life without magical powers or the threat of demons. After some contemplation Phoebe declines alongside her sisters, but the Angel of Destiny is not done with the sisters' and makes hints about Piper's pregnancy, which only Phoebe takes the hint and announces it.

==== Season 5 ====
For season five (2002–03), Phoebe attempts to live a life without Cole where she can focus on her career. This plan is stunted when a resurrected Cole returns to San Francisco eager to reconcile with Phoebe. After a series of attempts to win back Phoebe's affections, even trying to seduce her to evil once again, Cole is vanquished in the 100th episode of the series, "Centennial Charmed". Later in the season, Phoebe helps to deliver Piper and Leo's first child, Wyatt Matthew Halliwell. Soon after she begins a romantic relationship with her new boss, multi-millionaire Jason Dean (Eric Dane).

==== Season 6 ====
In season six (2003–04), Phoebe continues her relationship with Jason and also sees her magical abilities grow to include the power of empathy. Phoebe eventually becomes more serious with Jason, moving with him to Hong Kong. After a year of dating, Jason discovers Phoebe's secret identity as a witch by accident and, unable to handle the revelation, breaks up with her. Phoebe subsequently moves back to San Francisco and into the Manor. In the episode "The Legend of Sleepy Halliwell", Phoebe experiences a vision quest and not only discovers that her new time-traveling whitelighter Chris (Drew Fuller) is actually the second child of Piper and Leo and her nephew, but that she is also destined to have a child of her own. This puts Phoebe on a path of using her psychic powers to find the father of her child to the neglect of her other duties. For this, Phoebe is stripped of her unique powers by a Tribunal Council made up of both high-powered demons and Elders, though she retains her basic abilities as a witch and Charmed One. In the sixth-season finale, the sisters, Leo and Chris discover that a powerful Elder named Gideon (Gildart Jackson) wishes to destroy the Twice-Blessed Wyatt, an act which causes Wyatt to turn his back on good in the future.

==== Season 7 ====
At the start of season seven (2004–05), Phoebe is still stripped of her powers. After she begins to feel disconnected from her advice column audience, Phoebe takes a sabbatical from work and is temporarily replaced by a ghost-writer Leslie St. Claire (Nick Lachey). Phoebe and Leslie enter a brief romance, but it does not last long as Leslie moves to Los Angeles. In the episode "Styx Feet Under", Phoebe only regains her power of premonitions. In the hopes of having a demon-free life, Phoebe and her sisters join forces with The Avatars, powerful beings who are neither good nor evil, in their plan to turn the world into a utopia. Phoebe is the first of the sisters to regret this when her premonition powers show her how much the world has been robbed of its free will. The Charmed Ones team up with The Underworld's new leader, Zankou (Oded Fehr) to defeat The Avatars. However, Zankou then turns on the sisters, becoming their adversary for the remainder of the season. During this season Cole, while stuck in Limbo, arranges for the good-natured demon Drake De'mon (Billy Zane) to enter Phoebe's life and keep her from giving up on love. In the season seven finale, during a suicide mission to vanquish Zankou, Phoebe and her sisters fake their deaths in order to escape the constant threat of demon attacks, as well as police and government investigations.

==== Season 8 ====
For the eighth and final season (2005–2006), Phoebe takes on the false identity of Julie Bennett (Monica Allgeier) and begins a relationship with an artist named Dex Lawson (Jason Lewis). While under the influence of a spell cast by the prodigy of the Charmed Ones, Billie Jenkins (Kaley Cuoco), Phoebe marries Dex under the alias of Julie. Unsure if she could ever have a lasting marriage with someone she is not completely honest with, Phoebe reveals the truth of her hidden identity to Dex. The pair eventually break up and agree to get an annulment. Phoebe later meets a cupid named Coop (Victor Webster), who was sent by The Elders to help her find love again. When Phoebe discovers that Billie and her sister, Christy (Marnette Patterson) are the ultimate power The Charmed Ones must defeat to save Leo from the Angel of Death (Simon Templeman), she has reservations because the women are human and not demons. In the end, Phoebe participates in the ultimate battle between The Charmed Ones and the Jenkins sisters, which destroys the Halliwell Manor, and only Piper and Billie survive. In the series finale "Forever Charmed", Piper uses Coop's time-traveling ring to call upon her mother and grandmother and save Phoebe and Paige. After Christy is defeated, Phoebe and her sisters write about their lives in the Book of Shadows. An epilogue shows Phoebe and Coop getting married and that their marriage will produce three children, all daughters. Phoebe also becomes a successful author, writing a self-help book on finding love.

=== Literature ===
As one of the central characters throughout the entire series, Phoebe appears in the majority of Charmed literature. These appearances first began in the series of novels. The novels follow no strict continuity with the series or each other, and are often considered to be non-canon. However, the television series producers have final approval of everything in the novels, which could indicate the literature fitting into the established canon of the series and the so-called "Charmed universe". Phoebe's first appearance in Charmed literature takes place within the novel The Power of Three by Eliza Willard on November 1, 1999, which acts as a novelised version of the series premiere episode. Her last appearance in a Charmed novel takes place within Trickery Treat by Diana G. Gallagher on January 1, 2008.

In 2010, Charmed gained an officially licensed continuation in the form of a comic book, which is often billed as Charmed: Season 9. The series is published monthly by Zenescope Entertainment. Set eighteen-months after the series finale, the sisters are seen living happy demon free lives and have each entered into motherhood. Phoebe has had her first daughter with her husband Coop, who is named Prudence Johnna and nicknamed P.J. by Grams. Phoebe is also seen preparing to return to work as an advice columnist for The Bay Mirror. In the second issue of the comic, Phoebe regains her previously stripped powers of Levitation and Empathy. In Issue #6 of the comic, Morality Bites Back, Phoebe learns that she used Advanced Empathy to murder Cal Greene in a previously visited future of February 26, 2009, by reflecting his emotions back onto him which caused his brain to overload.

== Powers and abilities ==
=== Magical powers ===
In Charmed it is revealed that magical witches can develop and master a variety of magical skills and powers which include; scrying, spell casting, and brewing potent potions. As a magical witch Phoebe can utilize scrying, a divination art form that allows one to locate a missing object or person. Phoebe can also cast spells, often written in iambic pentameter or as a rhyming couplet, to influence others or the world around her. She can also brew potions, most often used to vanquish foes or to achieve other magical feats similar to the effects of a spell. As a witch and Charmed One, Phoebe has also developed a number of magical powers which include premonitions, levitation and empathy.

==== Premonitions ====
When Phoebe first comes into her powers, the first power she develops is the ability to see the future in the form of premonitions. Premonitions are considered to be a passive power. She triggers this power when she touches or is in the presence of something that is related to the subject of her premonitions, making them a form of psychometry. This originally only encompassed precognition, to see the future, but grew to include retrocognition, to see the past, as well. This power was initially uncontrollable, but in later seasons she learns to summon premonitions at will. While her premonitions are initially shown as black and white in the show, it is mentioned several times that Phoebe experiences them in color. As her power grows, her premonitions become more vivid to where they become slightly colored and she can hear and feel what is taking place. Phoebe's premonition powers also allow her visions to reveal the truth. For instance, in the season one finale, "Deja Vu All Over Again", when the world is caught within a recurring time loop by the time sorcerer Tempus (David Carradine), Phoebe is able to realize that the same day is repeating over and over again because of her premonition powers.

By season five, her power evolves to enable her to experience aspects of astral projection allowing her to interact with the environment of her premonitions. This aspect of her power is highlighted in the season five episodes "The Eyes Have It" and "Sand Francisco Dreamin'", as well as the season eight episode "Hulkus Pocus". Her premonition powers also evolve to allow Phoebe to anticipate the actions of others as in many instances Phoebe has sidestepped and jumped out the way of incoming fireballs and energy balls with perfect timing. Examples of this can be seen in the season seven episodes "Freaky Phoebe", where Phoebe is able to sense a demon who is behind her with a pair of scissors, and in the episode "Ordinary Witches", where Ronnie (Brian Howe), a cab driver Phoebe loses her powers to, is able to sense when and where the next fireball of a demon is going to be launched using her power of premonitions. Phoebe also develops the power to trigger a vision in someone else with similar powers, "sharing" visions with Elders and knowing how to trigger a specific "trap" premonition in the evil witch Mitzy (Jenny McCarthy), who has temporary possession of her powers. Kyra (Charisma Carpenter), a powerful demonic seer, tells Phoebe her powers were once limited to psychometry but they grew, like Phoebe's will in time.

==== Levitation ====
At the start of season three, in the episode "The Honeymoon's Over", Phoebe obtains her first active power in the form of levitation, the power to defy gravity and float in the air. This power is uncontrollable when she first obtains it, but she later learns to maintain complete control over it. When new to her power, Phoebe is unable to move horizontally, and in the season three episode "Once Upon a Time", Prue uses telekinesis to guide Phoebe across a cavern while she is levitating. Later in the series, Phoebe often mixes her martial arts and kick boxing with her levitating power to knock out her enemies. In season four, the power advances so that Phoebe is able to glide short distances while levitating and she even learns to use her power to walk on walls. During the fifth season, she is able to propel herself while levitating, as seen when she propels herself through a ventilation duct with her levitation powers in the episode "The Importance of Being Phoebe". In the season six episode "Forget Me... Not", Phoebe showcases a form of projective levitation, when she levitates herself and a weatherman. Phoebe displays projective levitation again in the episode "Love's a Witch" when she levitates the pillow she is sitting on along with her.

In the Charmed comic books, specifically in issue #16 "The Heavens Can Wait", her power has been shown to have grown stronger, allowing Phoebe to levitate Paige's orb shield which contained herself, her two sisters and Leo. While inside the Nexus of The All, Phoebe became able to use her power to its full potential, allowing her to not only fly but also to carry Piper and Paige with ease. Later, Prue tells Phoebe that her power will advance to this stage naturally at some point in the future.

==== Empathy ====
Season six sees Phoebe develop the power of empathy, the power to sense and experience the emotions of others. Being an empath allows Phoebe to directly channel the emotions of those around her. This initially causes considerable problems, as after encountering the emotions of others Phoebe would sometimes act on their whims or amplify and broadcast her own feelings, such as once triggering a fight in the Bay Mirror offices by accident (Although this could have unintended advantages; when the Halliwells were attacked by a demon that trapped them in their ideal worlds, Phoebe quickly realized something was wrong because her empathy powers caused her to tap into her boyfriend's desire for her to be a large-scale success where Phoebe was content being a local celebrity). In the Charmed series, magical powers are tied to the user's emotions, and because Phoebe can feel the emotions of others, her empathy allows her to sometimes tap into other characters' magical powers. This is first seen in the second half of the two-part season six premiere, "Valhalley of the Dolls (Part 2)". When a Valkyrie-turned-Piper attacks Phoebe, she channels Piper's telekinetic Valkyrie powers to where she can use them herself. This channeling of Valkyrie Piper's powers also made her powers, when used against Phoebe, ineffective. In later episodes, Phoebe also uses empathy to deflect energy balls and fireballs, causing them to backfire on their users.

In the season two episode, "Morality Bites", when the sisters travel to the future, it is revealed that Phoebe uses a magical power to kill a man named Cal Greene out of revenge. In the Charmed comics issue #6, "Morality Bites Back", Phoebe learns that this power is an advanced form of empathy, which is called Pathokinesis. Phoebe discovers that her empathy powers grow to allow her to incapacitate or even kill another person. In the comics, Phoebe realizes that she murders Cal Greene by reflecting his emotions back onto him, flooding his mind with painful emotions and memories of the women he had hurt, which causes his brain to overload.

=== Natural abilities ===
Early in the series, Phoebe is revealed to be a skilled pick-pocket; having picked up the technique during her rebellious teen years. Also, to make up for initially only having a passive power, Phoebe takes classes in self-defense. Her skills in hand-to-hand combat which includes Kung-Fu, Jeet Kune Do, & Kickboxing have advanced to the point where Phoebe is capable of beating multiple adversaries, most notably demonic wrestlers, furies, and vampires.

== Reception ==
Milano and Doherty's rumored off-screen feud earned them a nomination for Best Fight at the 2001 Wand Awards. In 2004, she was nominated for Favorite Female TV Character at the Spacey Awards in Canada. At the 2005 Nickelodeon Kids' Choice Awards, Milano was nominated for Favorite Television Actress. The following year, she was nominated for Television – Choice Actress at the Teen Choice Awards.

Kristin Sample of AOL TV called Phoebe "the hottest" witch out of the Halliwell sisters. In his review of the pilot episode, Ray Richmond of Variety magazine described Phoebe as "a free-spirited, self-absorbed conspiracy buff." In another review of the pilot episode, John Levesque of the Seattle Post-Intelligencer also labelled Phoebe "free-spirited", but felt that Milano's acting needed "seasoning." PopMatters' Michael Abernethy wrote that Milano provided "a lighter touch" to Charmed and noted that her "comic training" in sitcoms was "ideal for her carefree character" Phoebe. Angelica Bastien of Bustle magazine called Phoebe a "fan favorite" and commented that Milano "definitely fits the role much better than Lori [Rom] did. Just check out the YouTube video comparing their different takes on the character to see why it's best Milano took on the role." Brett Cullum of DVD Verdict named Phoebe "a wacky free spirit spitfire" and also believed that Milano was the right choice for Phoebe as she "provided an innate sense of comedy that rounded out the cast well." Rob Lineberger of the same publication felt that Milano's acting in the fifth season was "over the top in every way" and noted that she had a "hysterical physical presence." In his review of the sixth season, Lineberger wrote that Milano was "still singularly, blissfully goofy." Entertainment Weekly's Gillian Flynn also praised the comedy moments in the sixth season, writing "Milano has turned exasperation into an art form, as she's morphed into everything from Mata Hari to her combat-booted former teen self this season."

BuzzFeed's Jarett Wieselman commented on Phoebe's outfits in the later seasons, noting that many of the episodes featured her wearing "a series of progressively revealing and ridiculous costumes in the name of vanquishing." Joshua Levs of CNN labelled the costumes worn by Phoebe and her sisters "so skimpy", and noted that some of her memorable costumes included being a mermaid, "a leather-clad comic-book hero", and "topless on a horse." Levs also added that casting directors should pay attention because "Milano can act." A writer for MovieWeb described Phoebe as a "great, interesting, and relateable character." The writer also praised Milano for delivering an "incredibly convincing and believable performance", further adding that she "was another great casting choice" for Charmed. Hypable.com's Tariq Kyle felt that Phoebe was the best character on the show, adding "She's sweet and innocent in a lot of ways, but she's also strong and realistic. She's smart, but she's relatable. She still fails and makes mistakes, but she constantly grows."

== Cultural impact ==
In 2007, AOL TV ranked Phoebe at number seven on their list of the Top TV Witches. She also ranked seventh on the same list the following year. Virgin Media placed Phoebe at number 11 on their list of TV Temptresses, writing "As one of the trio of glamorous witches on ghostly drama Charmed, Phoebe can use her psychic premonitions for all sorts of japery including romance." Milano was referenced in the 2002 teen comedy film Big Fat Liar due to her portrayal as a witch in Charmed. In the film, Kaylee (Amanda Bynes) recalls watching an episode of Charmed on The WB where Milano "was about to cast a spell on her cute demon boyfriend." In his review of the television series Witches of East End being too similar to Charmed, Christian Cintron of Hollywood.com noted that Jenna Dewan-Tatum's "ne'er-do-well, bed-hopping character" Freya Beauchamp is a lot like Phoebe.

== See also ==
- Woman warrior
