= Piper Halliwell =

Charmed character

- Charmed character
- First appearance: "Something Wicca This Way Comes" (1.01)
- Last appearance: The Reason (10.20)
- Created by: Constance M. Burge
- Portrayed by: Holly Marie Combs; Ellen Geer (old Piper); Megan Corletto (young Piper); Hunter Ansley Wryn (young Piper, age 8); Alexis Raich (young Piper)

In-universe information
- Full name: Piper Halliwell
- Aliases: Jenny Bennett; Jamie Bennett
- Species: Charmed One; Witch
- Gender: Female
- Family: Patty Halliwell (mother; deceased); Victor Bennett (father); Prue Halliwell (older sister; deceased); Phoebe Halliwell (younger sister); Paige Matthews (younger maternal half-sister)
- Spouse: Leo Wyatt (2001–present)
- Children: Wyatt Halliwell (older son); Chris Halliwell (younger son); Melinda Halliwell (daughter)
- Relatives: Charlotte Warren (ancestor; deceased); Melinda Warren (ancestor; deceased); Allen Halliwell (grandfather; deceased); Penny Halliwell (grandmother; deceased); 9 Grandchildren
- Notable powers: Molecular Immobilization; Molecular Combustion

Piper Halliwell is a fictional character from the American television series Charmed, played by Holly Marie Combs from October 7, 1998, until May 21, 2006. The character was created by Constance M. Burge, who based Piper on her second-oldest sister. Piper is introduced into the series as the middle sister to Prue (Shannen Doherty) and Phoebe Halliwell (Alyssa Milano). She is one of the original featured leads and, more specifically, a Charmed One – one of the most powerful witches of all time. Piper's power was initially described as the ability to stop time in her surrounding environment. As the series progresses, Leo reveals that her power actually works by slowing down molecules to the point that they stop. She also receives the power to cause evil beings or objects to explode using her hands, by instead speeding up molecules to the point of combustion.

During the first three seasons, Piper is portrayed as the "sweet", "sensitive middle sister", and peacemaker of the group as she often attempts to keep the peace between her two sisters. She later develops a more aggressive and protective personality when she becomes the eldest sister from season four onwards, following Prue's death and the introduction of their younger half-sister Paige Matthews (Rose McGowan). Piper's storylines have often revolved around her protecting innocents and defeating the forces of evil in San Francisco with her sisters, as well as leading a normal life as a chef for a restaurant and later as the owner of a nightclub. Piper's central love interest throughout the series is Leo Wyatt (Brian Krause), the sisters' Whitelighter – a guardian angel for good witches. After the pair temporarily split in season two, a love triangle forms between Piper, Leo, and her neighbor Dan Gordon (Greg Vaughan). Piper and Leo eventually marry in season three, and later have a son named Wyatt in season five. They separate again at the end of season five, and Piper starts dating other men in the subsequent season. However, Piper and Leo reconnect towards the end of season six, resulting in a second son named Chris.

The character received a positive reception from television critics, who praised Combs' performance as Piper and her relationship with Leo. Combs garnered various awards and nominations for her portrayal of Piper. In 2007 and 2008, AOL TV ranked Piper third on their list of the Top TV Witches, behind Samantha Stephens from Bewitched and Willow Rosenberg from Buffy the Vampire Slayer. She was ranked sixth on both E! Online's 2011 list of the "Top 10 Most Bitchin' Witches", and The Huffington Post's 2016 list of "The Top 10 Greatest Witches of All Time". In addition to the television series, the character has also appeared in numerous expanded universe material, such as the Charmed novels and its comic book adaptation.

== Casting and development ==
In 1998, The WB began searching for a drama series, and looked to Spelling Television, which had produced the network's most successful series 7th Heaven, to create it. Expanding on the popularity of supernatural-themed dramas, the production company explored forms of mythology to find mythological characters they could focus on with contemporary storytelling. In order to create the series, Constance M. Burge was hired as the creator as she was under contract with 20th Century Fox and Spelling Television after conceiving the drama Savannah.

The character of Piper Halliwell was conceived by Burge, who wrote the pilot script for Charmed. The pilot script was based around three mismatched sisters who are initially based on Burge and her two older sisters, Laura and Edie Burge. Piper is based on Burge's second-oldest sister Edie. On creating Piper, Burge stated "The middle sibling typically tends to be a real people pleaser and very funny, tends to deal with life with a lot of humour. That really applied to my sister, Edie and so I could see the character of Piper [through her]." Executive producer Brad Kern stated that Piper was written into the series as "the middle sister just trying to keep the peace, trying to find love, trying to find her career, and trying to keep Prue and Phoebe from killing each other."

When the series was in its first development stages, executive producer Aaron Spelling had always known who he wanted for the role of Prue, Shannen Doherty, an actress from a previous Spelling Television series, Beverly Hills, 90210. Doherty already devoted to the project pitched the idea of her best friend for the role of Piper Halliwell, former Picket Fences actress Holly Marie Combs. Doherty played the role of Prue in a 28-minute test pilot (the "unaired pilot", never aired on television) alongside Combs and actress Lori Rom who played the youngest sister Phoebe Halliwell. Rom quit the series and a new pilot was filmed with former Who's the Boss actress Alyssa Milano, who took over the role of Phoebe.

== Appearances ==
=== Television ===
Piper is the second eldest Halliwell sister and is portrayed by Holly Marie Combs in all of the show's aired 178 episodes as well as the unaired pilot, making Combs the only cast member to appear in the complete series and the first pilot. At the start of season one (1998–99), six months have passed since the death of her Grams, Penny Halliwell (Jennifer Rhodes). Piper having already moved back into her family's Victorian Manor with her eldest sister Prue (Shannen Doherty), is later joined by their youngest sister Phoebe (Alyssa Milano). On the night of Phoebe's return, she finds a book called the Book of Shadows within the Manor's attic. After Phoebe unknowingly recites aloud what turns out to be an incantation from the book, the three sisters each receive a magical power and discover their destiny as The Charmed Ones – the most powerful good witches the world has ever known. Initially Piper receives the power to "freeze" her surrounding environment, beginning as she freezes her chef boss in a timed situation. A major plot for the first episode of the series focuses on Piper realizing that her boyfriend, Jeremy (Eric Scott Woods), is a warlock, when he seizes upon the opportunity to kill her for her powers, forcing Piper and her sisters to vanquish him. Due to her role as the middle sister, Piper is often regarded as the peacemaker of the group as she often attempts to keep the peace between the headstrong Prue and free-spirited Phoebe. During this season, Piper works at the restaurant Quake as a chef and later as its manager. She develops an on-again off-again relationship with the handy-man Leo Wyatt (Brian Krause) who she later discovers to be her whitelighter – a guardian angel for good witches.

In the second season (1999–2000), Piper has quit her job at Quake and has ventured into running her own business in the form of the nightclub P3. After her split with Leo, due to the strenuous nature his Whitelighter duties place on their romantic relationship, Piper begins to date her neighbor Dan Gordon (Greg Vaughan) in an attempt at a normal relationship. This causes major conflict as Leo and Piper retain lingering feelings for one another resulting in a love triangle between the three characters. As Piper hones her skills as a witch and a business owner, she eventually comes to the conclusion that despite her love for Dan, her heart will always belong to Leo. Piper later breaks up with Dan and reconciles with Leo. In the season two finale, Piper and her sisters discover that the many attacks on their lives by evil beings have been orchestrated by a demonic force known as The Council. Piper also desires to learn more about Leo's life as a whitelighter and asks him to take her to meet The Elders, senior whitelighters who act as the authoritative council for all of good magic. The couple are last seen orbing off to The Elders' heavenly realm.

In season three (2000–01), after being detained "Up There" for a month, Piper and Leo are told by The Elders to end their relationship or Leo will no longer be the sisters' whitelighter. Leo subsequently proposes marriage to Piper claiming that once married The Elders will not have the power to break them apart. Leo and Piper attempt to wed in secret during a solar eclipse, a phenomenon which prevents those "Up There" from looking down on Earth, but are caught in the act when The Elders are informed of the wedding by The Triad (who have replaced The Council), who in turn learned of the wedding through their demonic spy Cole Turner (Julian McMahon). Leo is taken into captivity by The Elders as punishment for breaking their rules and Piper is left heartbroken. After Piper makes the choice to continue to protect innocents despite losing Leo, The Elders return Leo to Earth. The Elders allow the couple to prove that their relationship will not interfere with their greater calling. Leo and Piper are finally allowed to wed in mid-season three. Piper and her sisters eventually learn that The Triad work for an even greater evil, The Source of All Evil who is the leader of the demonic realm known as The Underworld. Before the season's end, Piper acquires her second magical ability, the power to cause explosions. During the season three finale, Prue and Piper unwittingly expose themselves as witches to the world after being caught on camera by a local news crew fighting with The Source's personal assassin Shax. In the aftermath of the exposure, Piper is shot by a crazed Wiccan fanatic who wanted to join the sisters' coven and dies in the arms of Prue. In order to save her sister's life, Prue orders Leo to find Phoebe and pass on a deal to The Source to turn back time. This would reset the exposure of magic and save Piper's life. The Source agrees, knowing that he plans to double cross her in the end as Phoebe will be immune to the time reset while in The Underworld. In the end Phoebe will not be able to warn her sisters' of the assassin attack and he will kill her himself. Time is reversed to the sisters' first encounter with Shax, however Phoebe no longer answers when Prue calls for help, as she was never sent back. The season ends on a cliffhanger with Piper and Prue left for dead after losing in the fight against Shax. Meanwhile, Phoebe remains trapped in The Underworld.

In the opening episode of the fourth season (2001–02), "Charmed Again (Part 1)", it is revealed Piper has been healed of her injuries from the season three finale and Prue was unable to be saved. Piper attempts numerous spells to resurrect Prue to no avail, and when she comes into contact with her Grams, it is revealed that Prue is still struggling to adjust to being in the afterlife and that she is being helped to process her actual death by both Penny and the girls' mother Patty Halliwell (Finola Hughes). Penny also reveals to Piper that Prue cannot be summoned back to Earth because seeing Prue would not allow the sisters to grieve and move on to continue their destiny. This leads to Piper being broken and outraged towards everyone around her, especially to Leo which she states "saved the wrong sister". Finally accepting Prue is really gone, she attends the funeral of her big sister. This results in Phoebe having a premonition to save a young girl at the funeral and later discovering her identity as their younger half-sister Paige Matthews (Rose McGowan). A love child between their mother and her whitelighter, who was kept secret because of her whitelighter heritage. Piper struggles to accept the new sister and role of the now eldest sibling as she and Paige initially butt heads, but eventually grow to have a mutual respect for each other. With the addition of Paige, Piper and Phoebe are able to reconstitute the Power of Three and avenge Prue's death in vanquishing her murderer Shax and The Source himself twice – both in his original incarnation and that of his next incarnation, Cole. The sisters are later visited by the Angel of Destiny (Dakin Matthews) and given an offer to live a normal life without magical powers or the threat of demons. After Piper declines alongside her sisters, the Angel informs her that she is pregnant with her first child.

In season five (2002–03), the powers of her unborn child makes Piper indestructible. Initially, the baby makes her self-healing, and later protects her with a force field. When the child is born, to everyone's surprise, a boy—in a trip to the future she had only seen a daughter—Piper names him Wyatt Matthew Halliwell. Piper's son is discovered to be The Twice-Blessed Child, the most powerful magical being of all time, which attracts even more demons into the sisters' lives. In the fifth-season finale, a whitelighter from the future named Chris (Drew Fuller) arrives to assist the sisters against the ancient Titans of mythology. After the Elders are forced into hiding by the Titans, Chris manipulates events so that Leo has to become an Elder, causing him to separate from Piper. Piper is so angry that she initially refuses to give up her temporary powers (those of Demeter, Goddess of Earth), though Leo uses his newfound powers to artificially alleviate her pain.

In season six (2003–04), Piper again clings to goddess powers when she finds temporarily becoming a valkyrie a better alternative than living with the pain of Leo leaving her. Her sisters use a spell to bring back Piper's feelings of loss. She begins to recover from her separation from Leo and date again, though Chris (in reality, Piper's second son from the future) tries to stop this from happening. Chris is able to temporarily reunite Piper and Leo in the episode "The Courtship of Wyatt's Father" in order to ensure his conception. After gaining the sisters' trust, Chris informs them that his true mission is to prevent Wyatt from growing up to be the evil dictator he becomes in the future. Unlike her pregnancy with Wyatt, the pregnancy with Chris offers Piper no protection and she is forced to relocate to Magic School, with Wyatt, for her own protection. The Elder Gideon (Gildart Jackson), also headmaster of Magic School, attempts to kill baby Wyatt in order to prevent this future but is killed by Leo in the season six finale, the same episode in which future Chris dies and present-day Chris is born.

Season seven (2004–05) starts with Piper and Leo attending two Indian friends' wedding, where they are possessed by the spirits of two passing Hindu deities, Shakti and Shiva. Piper uses these powers to defend herself from demons dispatched to kill her by old enemy Barbas (Billy Drago). In the episode "Someone to Witch Over Me", Leo concedes to the offer of membership extended by The Avatars (powerful neutral beings who seek to create a Utopian reality). He informs Piper of his decision in the episode "There's Something About Leo" and later urges the sisters to join sides with The Avatars in their plan to turn the world into a utopia against the warnings of Paige's boyfriend Kyle Brody (Kerr Smith) and The Elders. Realising the Utopia robs people of their free will, Leo sacrifices himself. Piper realises her children's pain over their father's loss and allies with The Underworld's new leader, Zankou (Oded Fehr), to force The Avatars to rewind time to before the change took place. Leo later chooses to return to Piper in the 150th episode, "The Seven Year Witch", at the expense of his magical abilities, becoming mortal. Piper and Leo encounter evil Future Wyatt (Wes Ramsey) for themselves in the episode "Imaginary Fiends", but are able to stop the last impediment to his becoming a power for good. In the season seven finale, the sisters are forced to fake their deaths after they destroy Zankou and escape the constant threat of demon attacks, as well as police and government investigations.

The eighth and final season (2005–06) begins with the sisters assuming new identities (those of their fictitious cousins), with Piper assuming the identity of Jenny Bennett (Beatrice Rosen) and later Jamie Bennett (Regan Nicole Wallake). The sisters also take on neophyte witch Billie Jenkins (Kaley Cuoco) to do some of their magical legwork for them when she discovers who they really are. They later resume their real identities in the episode "Rewitched" with the help of federal agent Murphy (Brandon Quinn) in exchange for helping the FBI handle supernatural investigations. An Angel of Destiny (Denise Dowse) seizes Leo in the episode "Vaya Con Leos" to motivate Piper against their final threat as Charmed Ones. This turns out to be Billie and her sister, Christy (Marnette Patterson), who believe the sisters have stopped using their powers for good. In the penultimate episode, "Kill Billie, Vol. 2", the two sets of sisters undertake an all-out battle, which destroys the Halliwell Manor, and only Piper and Billie survive. In the series finale, "Forever Charmed", Piper uses cupid Coop's (Victor Webster) time-traveling ring to call upon her mother and grandmother and save the lives of her sisters. After Christy is defeated, Piper and her sisters write about their lives in the Book of Shadows. An epilogue depicts Piper with her three children including the addition of a daughter who she calls Melinda, and then living to old age (played by Ellen Geer) and being surrounded by children and grandchildren.

=== Literature ===
As one of the central characters throughout the entire series, Piper appears in the majority of Charmed literature. These appearances first began in the series of novels. The novels follow no strict continuity with the series or each other, and are often considered to be non-canon. However, the television series producers have final approval of everything in the novels, which could indicate the literature fitting into the established canon of the series and the so-called "Charmed universe". Piper's first appearance in Charmed literature takes place within the novel The Power of Three by Eliza Willard on November 1, 1999, which acts as a novelised version of the series premiere episode. Her last appearance in a Charmed novel takes place within Trickery Treat by Diana G. Gallagher on January 1, 2008.

In 2010, Charmed gained an officially licensed continuation in the form of a comic book, which is often billed as Charmed: Season 9. The series is published monthly by Zenescope Entertainment. Set eighteen-months after the series finale, the sisters are seen living happy demon free lives and have each entered into motherhood. Piper has had a third child, a girl named Prudence Melinda and is planning on opening her own restaurant. In Issue #4, Mortal Enemies, Piper develops a new power in the form of distorting the molecules of objects when she melts the ground to trap the resurrected Source of All Evil.

== Powers and abilities ==
=== Magical powers ===
In Charmed it is revealed that magical witches can develop and master a variety of magical skills and powers which include scrying, spell casting, and brewing potent potions. As a magical witch Piper can utilize scrying, a divination art form that allows one to locate a missing object or person. Piper can also cast spells, often written in iambic pentameter or as a rhyming couplet, to influence others or the world around her. She can also brew potions, most often used to vanquish foes or to achieve other magical feats similar to the effects of a spell. As a witch and Charmed One, Piper has also developed a number of magical powers which include molecular immobilization and molecular combustion.

==== Molecular Immobilization ====
As Piper first comes into her powers, the first power she develops is the ability to slow down molecular motion so that objects, people, and even energy discharges instantly freeze in place. In the Charmed series, certain magical powers are attached to emotional triggers, although all powers can be affected by the user's emotions. For Piper, the emotional trigger for her freezing power is panic induced situations which enact a fear response. At first Piper would freeze everything in the immediate area whenever startled. Gradually, Piper learned to control this ability and freeze everything in the immediate area by a conscious act of will and gesturing. She must be able to gesture to activate her freezing power and cannot do so without using her hands. Piper also learns to selectively freeze specific objects of her choosing, rather than everything in the entire area. She can even specify a particular type of entity to be frozen, as shown in Season 3, episode 1 ("The Honeymoon's Over") when she intentionally caused only the innocents to freeze in a courtroom, even without knowing which beings present were innocents and which were demons. When Piper was new to her powers, objects she froze would eventually regain their mobility on their own, usually after several seconds. She later learns to unfreeze at will, even freezing an entire object, then unfreezing only part of it. This can be seen in the season three episode "Sleuthing with the Enemy", at which point Piper freezes a Zohtar demon named Krell (Scott MacDonald) in midair, then unfreezes his head in order to interrogate him. In the second season episode, "Astral Monkey", Piper revealed that she could keep an object frozen as long as she focused, such as when she kept a metal disc thrown by a telekinetic Dr. Curtis Williamson frozen. As her powers developed, Piper was able to disrupt an object's momentum, as seen in the season four episode "Saving Private Leo", when she caused a dagger thrown at her to fall to the floor after she unfroze it instead of it resuming its original trajectory.

The mass of an object seems to be no restriction on her power. Instead, the limitation of her freezing power appears to be determined by the size of the area, and she can freeze anything (except those entities immune to her powers) in the area of effect. The exact limitation has never been determined. Indoors, however, Piper is limited by the room she is in. She can freeze objects in the same room and cannot freeze anything outside the room, unless she has an unobstructed path to those objects, such as through an open door or window. Piper's freeze could be broken with enough physical stimulus, and it doesn't take much effort to unfreeze somebody affected by this power; for example, Paige managed to unfreeze Leo by nudging his shoulder in "Long Live the Queen." Her grandmother, Penny, could also seemingly telekinetically unfreeze someone without necessarily moving them (possibly by telekinetically stimulating the frozen target's molecules), as seen in "That '70s Episode." In "A Witch In Time," the warlock Bacarra unfroze a knife in midair by incanting "glacies imber," thereby causing the knife to resume its trajectory. During the first season in "Feats of Clay," Piper herself admitted that continuous use of her freezing power in rapid succession was draining and could leave her exhausted. Certain entities have proven resistant or immune to her freezing ability, such as morally ambiguous witches, ghosts, furies, and certain demons and warlocks. However, as the series progresses, less and less enemies are immune to her power as it grows to the point that even the Triad, very powerful upper-level demons are frozen by it during the Charmed Ones final confrontation with their physical selves. Notably, unlike how one proved vulnerable to her combustion power, this was while the Triad was still at full power though they were seen to be starting to unfreeze before Piper unfroze them herself.

In the season two episode, "Morality Bites", Piper travels ten years into the future from the year 1999 and inhabits her future self's body. In the episode, Piper discovers that in ten years time, her freezing power becomes ten times stronger allowing her to instantly freeze an entire city block. After returning to the present, Piper never realizes the growth of this level of power before the series comes to an end.

==== Molecular Combustion ====
Piper uses her powers to vanquish a Banshee.

In late season three, Piper gains the ability to cause objects or evil beings to spontaneously explode using her hands. As explained by Leo in the episode "Exit Strategy", "[Piper's] powers work by slowing down molecules, and apparently now [she] can speed them up as well." Unlike her freezing power, this new ability is triggered by anger and frustration, but is also controllable by conscious act of will and hand gestures. She also proves able to cause magical energy discharges and even living entities to explode. However, the limitations on her explosive power are even less clear than those of her freezing ability, but appear to be determined by an object's size and durability. The largest object she ever caused to explode was a truck door entrance to a warehouse. It once took her four tries to break down a much smaller gate, although this object was magically reinforced. Apparently, Piper doesn't have to be directly in front of an object to blow it up, she just has to see it or know exactly were the object is. However, she has to aim her hands at her target in order for it to explode and has the potential of missing it, similar to throwing a projectile. For example, in the season four episode "Long Live the Queen," Phoebe pushed Piper's arms when she attempted to blast the demon Malick and she instead blew up a bicycle. Similarly, in the season seven episode "Witchness Protection," Leo pushed Piper away from blowing up Kyra and her hands missed the target, blowing up a picture instead. Although Piper needs to use her hands to use her exploding power, her heightened emotional state during the Blue Moon allowed her to blow things up without any hand gestures or even looking at her target. Over the course of the series, Piper's power grows to the point that even the most powerful demons are affected by it; she is able to vanquish Jeric, an Egyptian demon so powerful that in the past his enemies were only able to mummify him. She was also able to vanquish one of The Triad, three very powerful demons who had no known way of vanquishing them with just three hits from the power, albeit after he was weakened by the vanquish of one of his comrades. In later seasons, she also displayed the ability to deflect enemy attacks back at them in a similar way to telekinesis.

In the Charmed comics, specifically in Issue #4, Mortal Enemies, Piper's power evolves such that, short of blowing objects up, she can reverberate their molecules at a speed which causes them to become disordered, resulting in either melting or burning. Heat and fire can be created with the power also, as seen in Issue #9, The All or Nothing.

=== Natural abilities ===
Piper is proven to be a skilled chef, a talent which lends itself to her potion-making. While Piper has shown some gymnastic and athletic ability, unlike her sisters Phoebe and Prue, Piper has never pursued martial arts and is not particularly adept at physical combat, instead preferring to use active powers. But as the series continued and Piper takes a more leadership role, following Prue's death, her combative skills increased somewhat.

== Reception ==
In 2001, Combs was nominated for Outstanding Lead Actress in a Science Fiction Series at the RATTY Awards for her portrayal of Piper. She was nominated for Best Science Fiction Lead Actress at the same awards ceremony in 2002 and won that category in 2003.

In his review of the first season, Terry Kelleher of People magazine described Piper as "the sweet one" out of the three Halliwell sisters. PopMatters' Michael Abernethy wrote that Combs was "the most enjoyable to watch" and noted that her character Piper played "the role of compassionate mediator between her two sisters" in Charmed's first three seasons. While reviewing the first season, Brett Cullum of DVD Verdict wrote, "Piper is the most sensitive middle sister who seems to bridge the gap between the oldest and youngest—the diplomat. She could handle the drama handily, and anchored the show with her acting chops and Neve Campbell-esque brunette good looks." A writer for Film.com described Piper as "the moral compass and voice of reason for the 'Charmed Ones'." Rachel Day of Geek Speak magazine praised Combs' acting on Charmed, noting that the scenes of Piper grieving over the loss of Prue in the season four episode "Hell Hath No Fury" was "superbly done" and showcased her "anger and pain at Pru[e]'s death." Day also praised Piper and Leo's relationship as "the most successful depiction" throughout the series. She wrote, "The relationship traveled the course from forbidden love to marriage to separation to reconciliation and a happy ending. Personally, a lot of the charm about Charmed for me was the way the show really showcased this relationship with all its up and downs."

CNN's Joshua Levs called Piper "the show's solid foundation" and commended the writers for making Piper and Leo's relationship "interesting throughout the entire run by throwing in major wrenches left and right. I can't think of another series that's pulled that off." In reviewing the fourth season, Leigh H. Edwards of PopMatters felt that Piper and Leo provided "engaging, often funny material" when they were "navigating the equally momentous shoals of domesticity." Gillian Flynn of Entertainment Weekly commented that when it came to the comedy moments in the sixth season, Combs' acting was the best one out of the show's three lead actresses. Flynn described Piper as a "pert little mother" and "purse-lipped precision underplayer." In his mixed review of the eighth and final season, DVD Verdict's Ryan Keefer praised Piper's "incredibly emotional goodbye to Leo" in the episode "Vaya Con Leos" and felt that she was "the saving grace for this season."

== Cultural impact ==
In 2007, Piper was ranked third on AOL TV's list of Top TV Witches, behind Samantha Stephens from Bewitched and Willow Rosenberg from Buffy the Vampire Slayer. She also ranked third on the same list the following year. In 2011, E! Online ranked Piper at number six on their list of the Top 10 Most Bitchin' Witches, writing "You don't have to be evil to be bitchin'. Not only does Holly Marie Combs' witch possess...the ability to freeze time and to make objects spontaneously explode, but Piper is driven by the desire to protect her family and won't let anything get in her way." In 2016, Piper was also ranked sixth in The Huffington Post's list of "The Top 10 Greatest Witches of All Time", adding that "Piper is the true MVP of the Charmed Ones; over eight years she stepped into the role of family matriarch and proved that witches really can have it all, becoming a wife, mother and successful businesswoman, but never forgetting that sisterhood is everything."

Both the show and character were referenced in the episode "Sorry for Your Loss" of the sci-fi series The Tomorrow People, when Piper Nichols (Aeriél Miranda) introduces herself to Russell Kwon (Aaron Yoo), and he responds by saying "Charmed, Piper" In his review of the television series Witches of East End being too similar to Charmed, Christian Cintron of Hollywood.com noted that Rachel Boston's "high-strung but well meaning" character Ingrid Beauchamp "could be a carbon-copy of Piper."

== See also ==
- Woman warrior
