= House of Bones =

- Written by: Anthony C. Ferrante & Jay Frasco
- Directed by: Jeffery Scott Lando
- Starring: Charisma Carpenter; Corin Nemec; Marcus Lyle Brown; Ricky Wayne; Kyle Russell; Stephanie Honore
- Music by: Miles Hankins
- Country of origin: United States
- Original language: English

Production
- Running time: 90 minutes
- Production company: Millennium Media Services

Original release
- Release: January 16, 2010

House of Bones is a 2010 sci-fi horror film. The film was written by Anthony C. Ferrante and Jay Frasco, and it was directed by Jeffery Scott Lando. It stars Corin Nemec and Charisma Carpenter. The film was released on DVD January 25, 2011.

== Plot ==
Psychic Heather Burton (Carpenter) and a team of TV ghost-hunters travel to investigate a haunted house. Upon their arrival, they find a foreboding house with a mind of its own, and as darkness falls, the house begins to kill the crew one by one.

== Cast ==
- Charisma Carpenter as Heather Burton - a psychic
- Corin Nemec as Quentin French - the show host
- Marcus Lyle Brown as Greg Fisher - a lead investigator
- Colin Galyean as Simon - the other lead investigator
- Ricky Wayne, Jr as Tom Rule - the producer
- Kyle Russell Clements as Bub - the production assistant
- Stephanie Honoré as Sara Minor - the realtor

== Reception ==
The film was met with mixed reviews. Dread Central gave the film a negative review, however commented that the cast performed well despite the weak script.
