= Destruction: Los Angeles =

2017 film directed by Tibor Takács

- Directed by: Tibor Takács
- Story by: Krutin Patel; Sridhar Sreekakula
- Produced by: Todd Gilbert; Robert Van Norden; Sridhar Sreekakula
- Starring: Craig Sheffer; Cynthia Watros; Romeo Miller; Robert Giardina; Emmanuelle Vaugier; C. J. Valleroy
- Cinematography: Yuki Noguchi
- Edited by: Joe Plenys
- Music by: Ken Hor; Shi-Seng Lo
- Production company: Barking Cow Media Group
- Distributed by: Barking Cow Media Group; Lionsgate
- Release dates: September 20, 2017 (Malaysia); September 21, 2017 (France)
- Running time: 93 minutes
- Country: United States
- Language: English

Destruction: Los Angeles is a 2017 disaster film directed by Tibor Takács.

== Plot ==
A volcano erupts near the metropolis of Los Angeles, followed by a fatal explosion and a strong, sudden earthquake. Finally, a rain of fire pours on the city and complete chaos breaks out. Family man and journalist John Benson sees his professional opportunity: he intends to write about the events in as much detail as possible in order to make a breakthrough as a journalist. As a result, he's studying the increasing seismic activity around the city.

However, he is also keen to keep his wife, Cathy, and their two children, Derek and Brooke, safe, and more than once faces the conflict between excellent reporting and the protection and safety of his family.

== Cast ==
- Craig Sheffer as John Benson
- Cynthia Watros as Cathy Benson
- Romeo Miller as Marcus Taylor-Jones
- Robert Giardina as Good Samaritan
- Emmanuelle Vaugier as Margot Taylor
- C. J. Valleroy as Derek Benson
- Sydne Mikelle as Brooke Benson (as Sydney Mikelle)
- Liberte Chan as Olivia Li
- Omar Angulo as Army National Guardsman
- Cosima Cabrera as Maria
- Raymond Forchion as Fire Marshall
- Roger Howarth as Dr. Paul Grant
- Redaric Williams as Darnell
- Master P as Jay Jones
- Mykel Shannon Jenkins as Officer Helms
- Morgan Obenreder as Jessie – Paranoid Guest
- Rene Aranda as Police Officer (uncredited)

== Reception ==
The film received a 21% rating on Rotten Tomatoes from fewer than 50 ratings.

German online film portal Filmdienst wrote of the film, "A thoroughly conventional disaster film with all the melodramatic and action-packed clichés of the genre. Also listless in the treatment of the subplot about the figure of the reporter between desire for sensation and responsibility."

German film magazine TV Spielfilm criticizes the film for what it perceived was an "unimaginative" story with "cheap" special effects, saying that it "triggers comedy rather than panic." Director Tibor Takács is mockingly called in the review a "trash specialist." The review ends saying, "L.A. is burning – unfortunately the film survived."
