= Andy T. Tran =

American actor

- Born: October 6, 1983 (age 41); Houston, Texas, U.S.
- Education: Bachelor's degree in Economics, University of Texas at Austin (2006)
- Occupation: Actor
- Known for: his role as Lt. Andy Chung in the TV series, The Last Ship

Andy T. Tran (born October 6, 1983) is an American actor. He is best known for his role as Lt. Andy Chung in the TNT series, The Last Ship, executive-produced by Michael Bay.

== Career ==
Tran graduated from the University of Texas at Austin in 2006 with a Bachelor's degree in Economics, minoring in Mathematics. While in school, he wrote, acted, and directed award-winning comedy shows in university-wide talent competitions that led him to become a sketch player for multiple comedy troupes in Austin, TX from 2007 to 2009. He then segued into film acting, making his television debut in NBC Chase, Season 1, Episode 11 - "Betrayed". Tran has since appeared in FOX Bones, CBS NCIS: Los Angeles, CBS CSI: NY, Nickelodeon Big Time Rush, and ABC Reckless. He has also starred in award-winning films such as Post-Racial and "Cabernet", in which Tran was also nominated best performer.
