= Judika Illes =

American occult writer

Judika Illes is an American author of esoteric non-fiction books, aromatherapist and tarot reader.

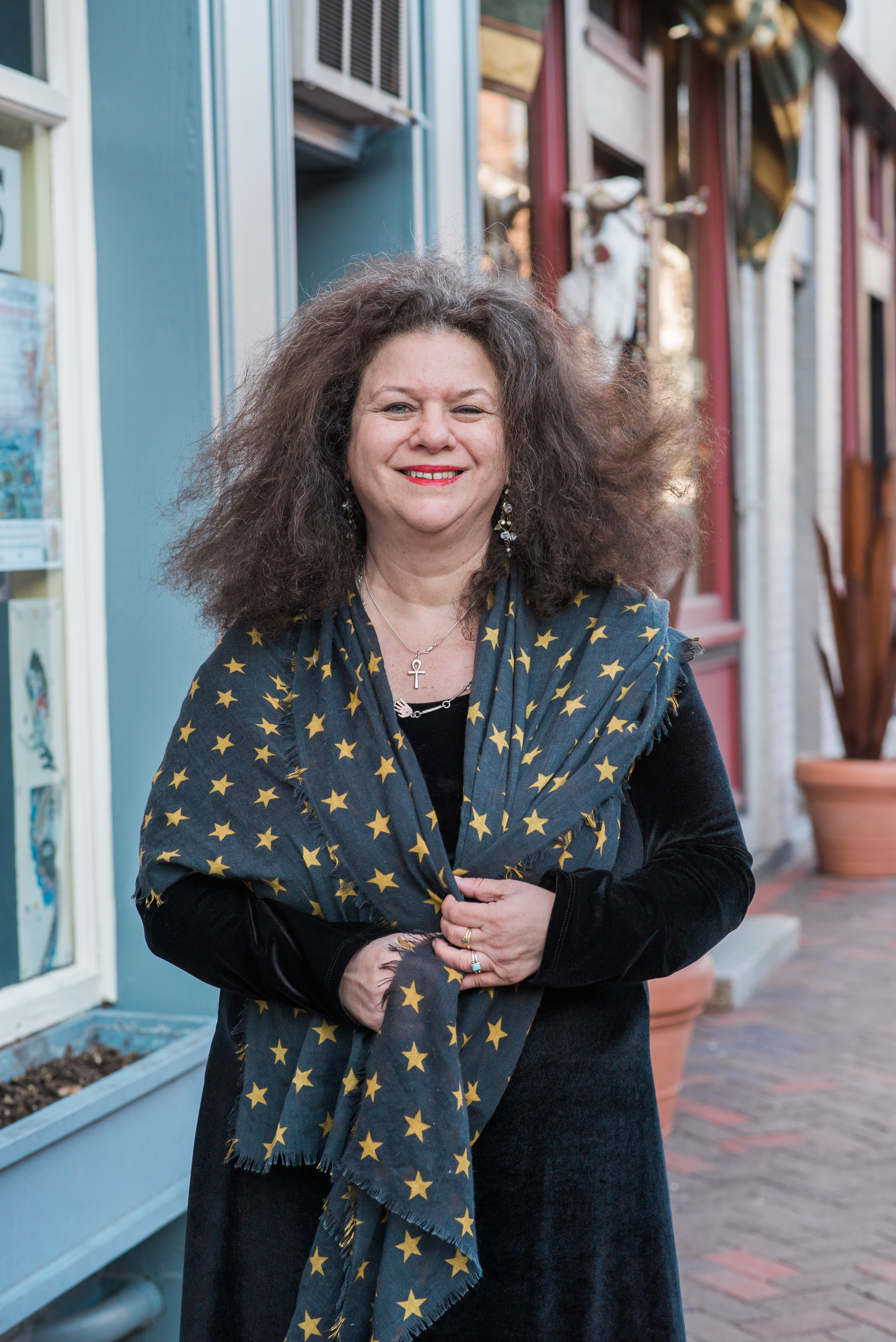
Judika Illes (March 2017)

== Early life ==
Her background is Hungarian and she attributes a childhood spent in the culturally diverse Queens borough of New York City as a significant influence on her writing career. Illes explains that her interest in divination began while playing with a Tarot deck at the age of six. Her first Tarot deck was the Builders of the Adytum (BOTA) deck, which she described in a 2005 interview as "formidable and very esoteric," an unusual starter for a child of her age. In an interview in 2016, Illes reported that she still had the BOTA deck, which her sister had purchased from the Samuel Weiser Bookstore in New York City.

During her teen years, Illes frequented New York bookstores such as Magickal Childe and Samuel Weiser's, known for their metaphysical and occult collections, as well as botanicas Her love for esoteric books led to her interest in astrology, which began with Zolar's It's All in the Stars.

She has a Bachelor of Arts in English and Communications from Rutgers College and earned a Graduate Certificate in Aromatherapy from the American College of Healthcare Sciences (previously known as the Australasian College of Health Sciences) in 1999.

== Career ==
Illes worked as a tarot reader and dream interpreter on psychic hotlines from 1991 to 1993. She went on to become a prolific author of metaphysical books and especially reference books.

Her writing interests include folklore, folkways, mythology, astrology, spellcasting, spirit-working, herbalism and traditional healing. She also covers the subjects of the occult, magic, divination, spiritualism, fairies, witchcraft and the paranormal.

A certified aromatherapy consultant, she has taught introductory courses on the subject at the Australasian College (2000–2002), and practices taromancy. Although she practices and teaches other forms of divination, she considers Tarot to be her "main practice" and has been reading Tarot cards professionally since the age of 26.

She sometimes holds workshops relating to her books or other specialized subjects. In 2012, she gave a workshop on the use of symbols as part of the SIgils & Signs Art Show at Observatory in Brooklyn. She gives similar workshops and presentations intermittently throughout the year.

The first complete book Illes wrote was about traditional methods of enhancing fertility. It contained a chapter about magic spells, which a publisher asked her to expand into a book of its own, eventually published as Pure Magic: A Complete Course in Spellcasting. The manuscript about fertility was set aside, but in a 2011 interview by The Witches' Almanac, Illes mentioned that she may eventually publish it under the title, Frogs and Pomegranates.

After the release of The Encyclopedia of 5000 Spells, her publisher suggested an encyclopedia about witchcraft. A note of encouragement from the Non-Wiccan Witches Yahoo group persuaded her to accept the challenge, which led to The Element Encyclopedia of Witchcraft. According to Illes, most encyclopedias about witchcraft were written by outsiders and "not really about witches or their craft."

Illes has been an occasional guest on George Noory's nightly radio broadcast, Coast to Coast AM, where she has discussed spellcasting, witchcraft and other occult subjects. She has also been featured as a guest on Ripley's Radio Oddcast, Fangoria Radio, the Hilly Rose Show, and Rob McConnell's "X" Zone radio show.

== Name ==
Her last name, Illes, is pronounced as you would with the "Ph" omitted from "Phyllis." Judith Illes was used as the byline for some of her Tour Egypt articles, rather than her Hungarian name, Judika.

In an interview with The Witches' Almanac, Illes disclosed that she used "Judith Joyce" as her byline when she wrote The Weiser Field Guide to the Paranormal due to the short period between her other Weiser field guides.

== Bibliography ==
=== Books ===
- The Big Book of Practical Spells: Everyday Magic That Works. Weiser Books (2016). ISBN 978-1578635979. Previously published by Weiser (2007) as Pure Magic: A Complete Course in Spellcasting and Fair Winds Press (2001) as Earth Mother Magic: Ancient Spells for Modern Belles. A foreword was added to the 2016 version.
- The Weiser Book of the Fantastic and Forgotten: Tales of the Supernatural, Strange, and Bizarre. This collection of stories by other authors was edited by Judika Illes, with her introduction. Red Wheel/Weiser, LLC (2016). ISBN 978-1-57863-606-8.
- The Encyclopedia of Mystics, Saints & Sages: A Guide to Asking for Protection, Wealth, Happiness, and Everything Else!. Harper Collins Publishers (2011). ISBN 978-0-06-200957-9.
- The Weiser Field Guide to the Paranormal. Red Wheel/Weiser LLC (2010). ISBN 978-1-57863-488-0. (published under the pseudonym, Judith Joyce)
- The Weiser Field Guide to Witches: from Hexes to Hermione Granger, From Salem to the Land of Oz. Weiser Books (2010). ISBN 978-1-57863-479-8.
- The Encyclopedia of Spirits: the ultimate guide to the magic of fairies, genies, demons, ghosts, gods, and goddesses. Harper Collins Publishers (2009). ISBN 978-0-06-135024-5.
- The Encyclopedia of 5000 Spells. HarperOne (2008). ISBN 978-0-06-171123-7. Previously published as The Element encyclopedia of 5000 spells: the ultimate reference book for the magical arts. HarperElement (2003). ISBN 0-00-716465-3.
- Magic When You Need It: 150 Spells You Can't Live Without. Weiser Books (2008). ISBN 1-57863-419-9. Previously published as Emergency Magic! 150 Spells for Surviving the Worst Case Scenario. Weiser Books (2002).
- The Element Encyclopedia of Witchcraft: a complete A-Z of the entire magical world. Harper Element (2005). ISBN 0-00-719293-2.
- Daily Magic: Spells and Rituals for Making the Whole Year Magical HarperOne (2021) ISBN 9780062876829
- Witches: A Compendium Weiser Books (2024) ISBN 9781578638574

=== Articles ===
The following articles by Judika Illes were part of her monthly column, Beauty Secrets of the Ancient Egyptians, published during 2000 and 2001 by the Egyptian Ministry of Tourism in its on-line magazine, Tour Egypt.

Ancient Beauty Secrets (monthly column series):

- Ancient Facial Secrets (Introduction), Vol. I, No. 1, June 1, 2000.
- Haircare and Wigs, Vol. I, No. 2, July 1, 2000.
- Perfumes of Ancient Egypt, Vol I No. 3, August 1, 2000.
- Ancient Egyptian Eye Makeup, Vol. I, No. 4, September 1, 2000.
- Nefertem, Ancient Lord of Perfume, Vol. I, No. 5, October 1, 2000.
- Tattoos in Ancient Egypt, Vol. I, No. 6, December 1, 2000.
- Henna, Vol. II, No. 1, January 1, 2001.
- Fertility Shrines of Ancient Egypt, Vol. II, No. 2, February 1, 2001.
- Tutankhamun's Perfume, Vol. II, No. 3, March 1, 2001.
- Flowers: The Fundamental Fashion Accessory, Vol. II, No. 4, April 1, 2001.
- The Beginning of the Book of Making an Old Man into a Young Man..., Vol. II, No. 5, May 1, 2001.
- Cats Eyes and Eye Make Up, Vol. II, No. 7, July 1, 2001.
- Glass Beads: "Fabulous Fakes" and the Birth of Costume Jewelry, Vol. II, No. 8, August 1, 2001.

Feature Articles published in Tour Egypt, 2000 - 2001:

- Hathor, Lady of Beauty
- Beauty Salts
