= Morgan Obenreder =

American actress

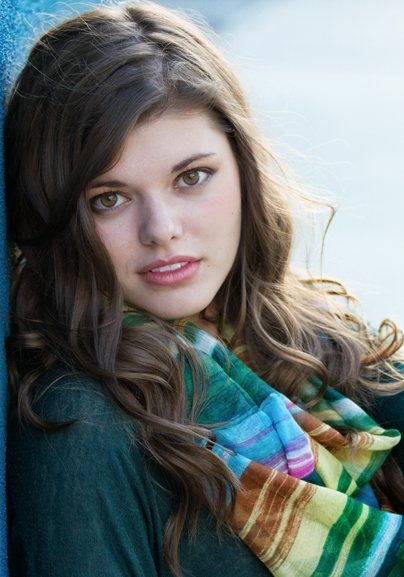
- Obenreder in 2013
- Born: Morgan Obenreder; April 9, 1995 (age 31); Yardley, Pennsylvania, U.S.
- Occupation: Actress
- Years active: 2012–present

Morgan Obenreder (born April 9, 1995) is an American actress.

== Early life ==
Morgan Obenreder was born in Yardley, Pennsylvania in 1995. Upon moving with her family to DuBois, she began acting at the local Reitz theater at the age of 7. She went on to perform in school plays during her teenage years.

== Career ==
While in high school, Obenreder attended an acting camp in Los Angeles. She subsequently moved to California and signed with an agency. In 2012, at the age of 16, she began appearing in minor parts in independent short films and television shows, including the Fox series Bones and Nickelodeon's See Dad Run.

In 2015, she played Charisma Carpenter's daughter in the erotic drama Bound. Though the film received a generally lukewarm response, Through The Shattered Lens praised Obenreder's performance, and her work was also spotlighted by Fandango Movieclips.

She appeared in the science-fiction military thriller Rz-9, which follows a resistance effort in a dystopian America. For her work in the film, Obenreder was nominated for the Best Actress accolade at the 2015 Northeast Film Festival.

In 2016, Obenreder guest-starred as a naval officer on the CBS drama NCIS. Following this, she appeared in the lead role of the Lifetime dramatic film Double Mommy. In the feature, she plays a teenager named Jess, who learns that she is pregnant with twins fathered by different boys, one of whom date-raped her. Jess gradually seeks to expose her rapist while building a life with her boyfriend.

Throughout the rest of 2016, she appeared in the Netflix comedy film Mascots and the go90 show Mr. Student Body President, in which she played a snobby cheerleader.

In 2017, Obenreder was cast in CBS's long-running soap opera The Young and the Restless. She portrayed Crystal Porter, a captive in a sex-trafficking ring who rebels and enters a witness-protection program, and received positive reviews by SoapHub.com.

In 2018, she appeared in another Lifetime film, as the nanny in the drama Nanny Killer.

In 2019, Obenreder played Kelsey Jackson in the film Taking Your Daughter. She briefly reprised the role of Crystal on The Young and the Restless in 2022.

== Filmography ==
=== Film ===
| Year | Title | Role | Notes |
|---|---|---|---|
| 2012 | Haven's Point | Jess | Short |
| 2015 | Bound | Dara | |
| 2015 | Rz-9 | Samantha Endcott | |
| 2015 | Mormon for a Month | Beth Kenwood | |
| 2016 | Double Mommy | Jess | Lead role |
| 2016 | Fortune Cookie | Isabelle | |
| 2016 | Mascots | Nanny | |
| 2017 | Destruction: Los Angeles | Jessie | |
| 2018 | Nanny Killer | Kate Jordan | Lead role |
| 2019 | Taking Your Daughter | Kelsey Jackson | |

=== Television ===
| Year | Title | Role | Notes |
|---|---|---|---|
| 2013 | Buona Sera News | Samantha Mancini | |
| 2013 | The Ghost Speaks | Tina | |
| 2013 | Bones | Amanda Watters | |
| 2014 | See Dad Run | 18-Year-Old Janie | |
| 2014 | My Haunted House | Samantha | |
| 2016 | NCIS | Mary Burk | |
| 2016 | Mr. Student Body President | Natalie Vrendenburgh | |
| 2017 | The Young and the Restless | Crystal Porter | |

== Awards and nominations ==
| Award | Year | Film | Category | Result | Ref. |
|---|---|---|---|---|---|
| Northeast Film Festival | 2015 | Rz-9 | Best Actress | Nominated | |
