= Power of Three (Charmed) =

Bond in the television series Charmed

- Charmed element
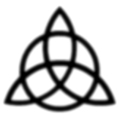
- The "Power of Three" is represented by the Triquetra
- Publisher: Spelling Television
- First appearance: Something Wicca This Way Comes
- Created by: Constance M. Burge
- Genre: Magic

In-universe information
- Type: Magical bond
- Owners: Charmed Ones
- Function: Can be used to defeat evil when regular spells don’t work
- Affiliation: The Charmed Ones

The term "Power of Three" in the original Charmed television series (1998–2006) and its reboot series of the same name (2018–2022), refers to the bond and connection between three sisters, known as The Charmed Ones, who are said to be the most powerful trio of witches. The term is represented by the triquetra symbol, which is placed on the cover of the sisters' Book of Shadows in both shows. Each sister has individual magical powers, which is noticeably stronger when they are combined as the "Power of Three". The sisters use their powers to protect innocent lives and vanquish demons and warlocks, often invoking their joint "Power of Three" to defeat their enemies.

In the original Charmed series, the "Power of Three" was originally the Halliwell sisters Prue (Shannen Doherty), Piper (Holly Marie Combs) and Phoebe (Alyssa Milano). However, following Prue's death in the third-season finale, their long-lost younger half sister Paige Matthews (Rose McGowan) takes Prue's place within the "Power of Three" from the fourth season until the eighth and final season. In the reboot series, a new "Power of Three" is formed by the Vera/Vaughn sisters Macy (Madeleine Mantock), Mel (Melonie Diaz), and Maggie (Sarah Jeffery).

== Original series ==
=== Power of Three connection ===
In the original Charmed series (1998–2006), the "Power of Three" is represented by the triquetra symbol, which is placed on the cover of the Halliwell sisters' book of witchcraft, the Book of Shadows. The "Power of Three" refers to the bond and connection between the three Halliwell sisters, which is noticeably stronger when their individual powers are combined. In the pilot episode "Something Wicca This Way Comes", the youngest sister Phoebe (Alyssa Milano) discovers the Book of Shadows and reads a magical incantation out loud, which activates each sister's individual power as well their combined "Power of Three". Throughout the series' run, the sisters are able to vanquish powerful demons and warlocks by using their combined "Power of Three" and chanting spells together, although the latter is not always necessary as long as all three sisters are together for the spells to work. The most well-known "Power of Three" spell was used in the pilot episode, when the sisters are heard chanting, "the power of three will set us free," to vanquish a warlock and protect themselves against fire. The "Power of Three" is connected to the sisters, both emotionally and magically. This has been explored in several episodes throughout the series, mostly notably the season three episode "Power Outage", when the sisters lose their powers after using them against each other during an argument, only regaining them once they reconcile.

=== Halliwell sisters ===
The "Power of Three" originally included Prue (Shannen Doherty), Piper (Holly Marie Combs), and Phoebe Halliwell (Alyssa Milano). The Halliwell sisters are also known as The Charmed Ones, said to be the most powerful witches ever known. In addition to their combined "Power of Three", each sister has individual powers; the eldest Prue initially receives the ability to move objects with her mind by channeling telekinesis through her eyes, later through hands, middle sister Piper initially receives the power of molecular immobilization, but referred to as "freezing" people and objects in time, and the youngest Phoebe initially has the power of premonition, enabling her to see into the future and the past. The sisters use their powers to protect innocent lives and vanquish various demons and warlocks, often invoking their joint "Power of Three" to defeat their enemies. Their magic is rooted in their bond as sisters and as a family. Each sister's powers grow and evolve as the series progresses to the point where they also develop new ones. Prue eventually channels her telekinesis through her hands and gains the power of astral projection in season two, while in season three, Piper gains the ability of molecular combustion, which gives her the ability to cause objects or evil beings to spontaneously explode, and Phoebe gains the power to levitate. As these new powers appear, their joint "Power of Three" also appears to strengthen.

Following Prue's death in the season three finale "All Hell Breaks Loose", Piper and Phoebe discover that they have a long-lost younger half-sister, Paige Matthews (Rose McGowan), at the beginning of season four. Paige then goes on to help reconstitute The Charmed Ones by taking Prue's place in the "Power of Three". This is made possible after it is revealed that she is the daughter of the Halliwell sisters' mother Patty (Finola Hughes) and her Whitelighter Sam Wilder (Scott Jaeck). Paige was given up at birth to protect her from the wrath of The Elders if they were to discover her Whitelighter heritage. Paige's magical abilities represent her dual heritage as both a witch and whitelighter; like Prue, she possesses a form of telekinesis, but she has to verbally call for objects to teleport ("orb") them to their intended destination.

=== Other variations ===
The "Power of Three" has also been seen in other forms throughout the series. For example, in the season one episode "That 70s Episode", Patty casts a spell with young Prue and Piper as she is pregnant with Phoebe at the time. In another occurrence, Penny, Patty (who was pregnant with Phoebe at the time), and Piper use the "Power of Three" to banish the Hollow in the final episode "Forever Charmed".

Any three people possessing each of the Charmed Ones' powers through their blood or casting the "To Call a Witch's Powers" spell can form their own "Power of Three", provided they can stop the original users from channeling it in the first place. The Stillman Sisters exploited this for their own ends when impersonating The Charmed Ones in the season six episode "The Power of Three Blondes".

== Reboot series ==
In the reboot series of Charmed (2018–2022), a new "Power of Three" is formed by sisters Macy (Madeleine Mantock), Mel (Melonie Diaz) and Maggie Vera (Sarah Jeffery). Each sister has an individual power; the eldest Macy has the power of telekinesis, middle sister Mel has the power of temporal stasis, and the youngest Maggie can hear people's thoughts; through telepathy. Similar to the original series, the Vera sisters use their powers to protect innocents and vanquish demons, also often invoking their combined "Power of Three" to chant spells together and defeat their enemies. The "Power of Three" in the reboot is also represented by the triquetra symbol, which is on the cover of the Vera sisters' Book of Shadows. The current incarnation of "The Charmed Ones" was formed in 2022, six months after the tragic death of Macy Vaughn and consists of Melanie Vera, Michaela Danso and Margarita Vera.
