= Charisma Carpenter =

American actress (born 1970)

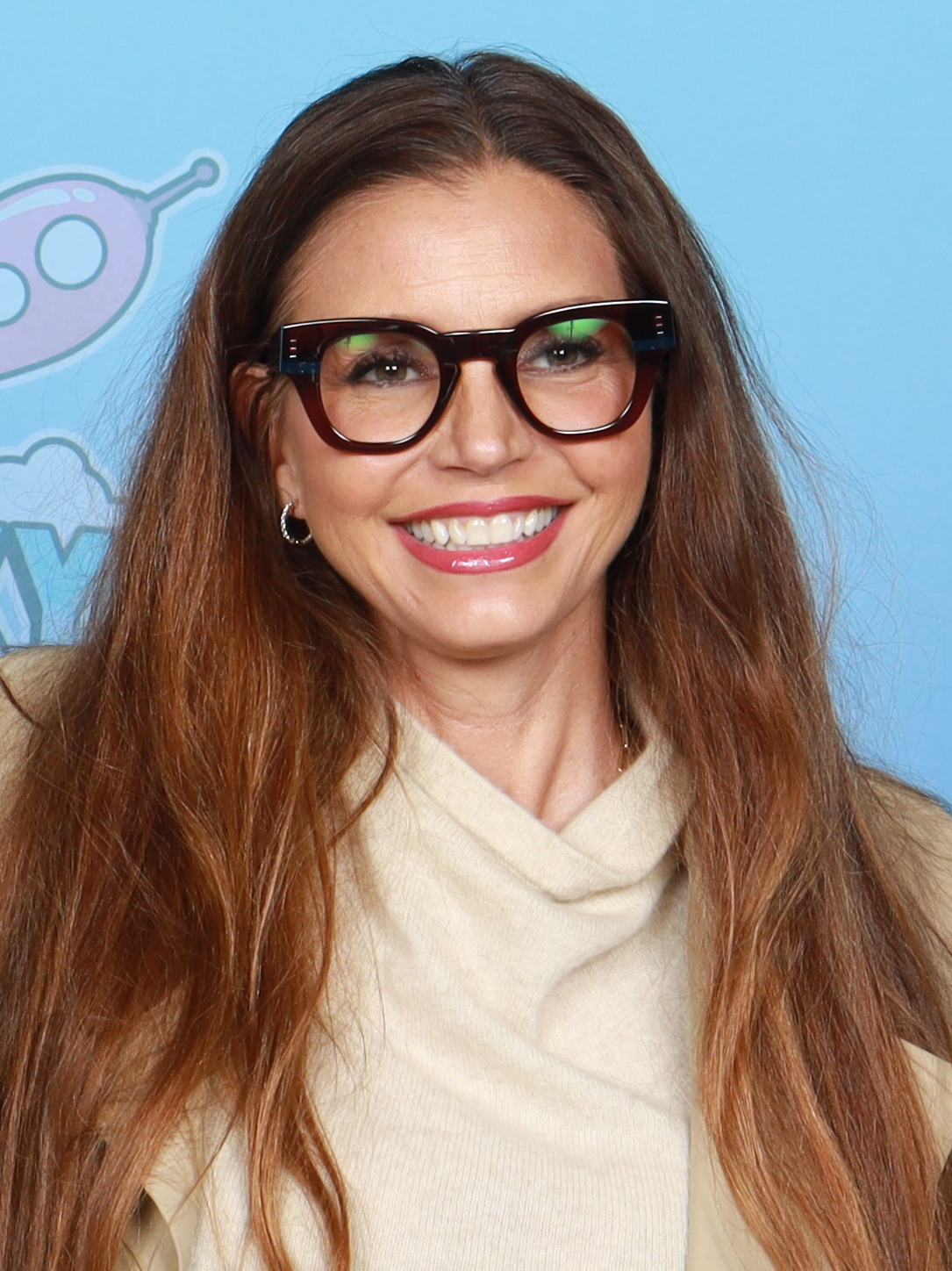
- Carpenter in 2025
- Born: July 23, 1970 (age 56); Las Vegas, Nevada, U.S.
- Occupation: Actress
- Years active: 1994–present
- Spouse: Damian Hardy (m. 2002; div. 2008)
- Children: 1

Charisma Carpenter (born July 23, 1970) is an American actress. She played Cordelia Chase in the supernatural drama series Buffy the Vampire Slayer (1997–1999) and its spin-off series Angel (1999–2004). She also starred as Kyra in Charmed (2004), Kendall Casablancas in Veronica Mars (2005–2006), Rebecca Sewell in The Lying Game (2012–2013), and Lacy in The Expendables film series (2010–2012).

== Early life ==
Carpenter was born in Las Vegas, Nevada, the only biological child of Christine, a bird sanctuary worker, and Don Carpenter, a salesman. She is of Spanish (from her maternal grandfather), French, and German descent. Carpenter attended Bishop Gorman High School in Las Vegas; she was also a part of a song-and-dance troupe which performed in the Las Vegas Valley when she was nine years old.

When Carpenter was 15, her family moved to Rosarito Beach, Baja California, Mexico and then to San Diego, California. She attended Bonita Vista High School and Chula Vista School of the Creative and Performing Arts. After graduation, Carpenter traveled throughout Europe. When she returned to San Diego, she worked as a video store clerk, an aerobics instructor, and in property management. In 1991, she worked as a cheerleader for the San Diego Chargers football team. In 1992, she moved to Los Angeles.

While swimming in San Diego in 1991, she and two male friends were attacked by Henry Hubbard, Jr., a former San Diego police officer and serial rapist, who attempted to subdue them at gunpoint. During the struggle, both her friends and Hubbard were shot, forcing him to flee the scene; both friends survived the attack. Hubbard was arrested, convicted, and sentenced to 56 years in prison for a series of rapes and robberies. Carpenter brought Hubbard's police-issued flashlight from the beach, which he had left at the scene, and the flashlight became a key piece of evidence used against him.

== Career ==
Carpenter was discovered by a commercial agent while waiting tables in Los Angeles to save money for her college education. This led to her role on theatrical productions and more than 20 commercials. She made her first television role in 1994 by appearing in an episode of Baywatch. Shortly after that, she landed a starring role in the NBC short-lived teen drama/soap opera series Malibu Shores.

In 1996, Carpenter auditioned for the title role in The WB supernatural drama series Buffy the Vampire Slayer, but instead was cast as Cordelia Chase, a snobby and popular high school student. After three seasons on Buffy the Vampire Slayer, Carpenter was offered an even larger role as the same character on the spin-off series Angel alongside David Boreanaz. She played Cordelia Chase for four seasons on Angel. Although her character leaves the series during Angel's fourth season, Carpenter returned for the 100th episode in the fifth and final season.

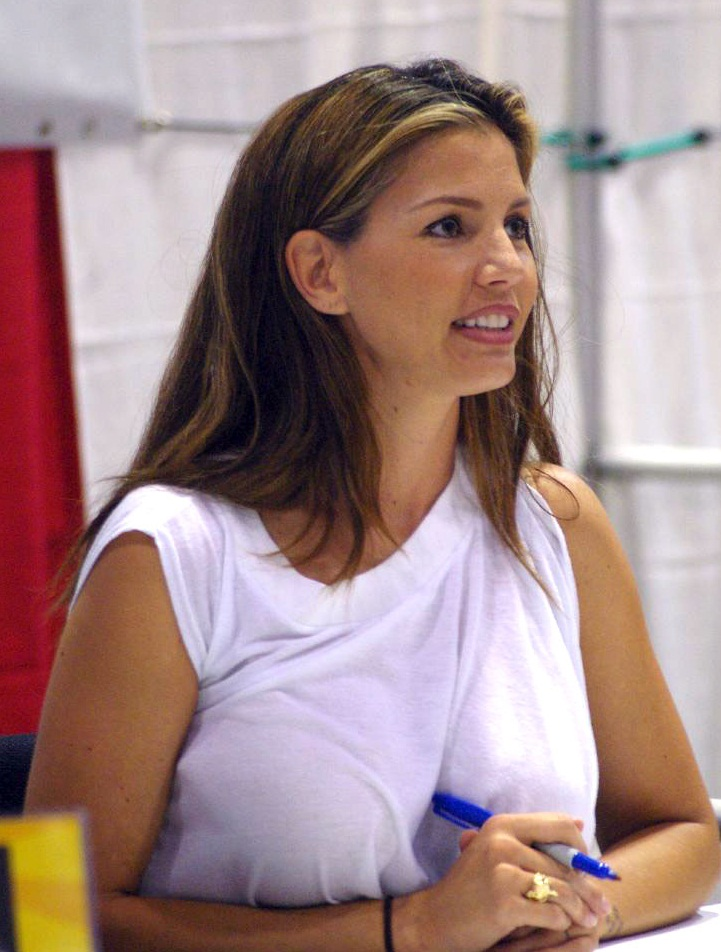
Carpenter at the Fan Expo 2007 Convention in Toronto, Ontario

In 2004, Carpenter had a guest appearance in The WB fantasy drama series Charmed as a psychic demon named Kyra for three episodes and played a recurring role on NBC's Miss Match, appearing in four episodes. She also had a recurring role as Kendall Casablancas in the UPN mystery drama series Veronica Mars for the 2005–06 season, appearing in 11 episodes. Carpenter guest-starred in the first-season finale of the ABC Family comedy-drama series Greek and reprised her role for two episodes of season two. According to TV Guide in September 2007, she was set to join the cast of The Apprentice: Celebrity Edition, but instead she chose to do a guest appearance in the Fox comedy series Back to You, as well as a two-episode role on the short-lived series Big Shots. Carpenter also had a guest appearance in an April 2009 episode of CSI: Crime Scene Investigation entitled "The Descent of Man".

On March 20, 2008, Paley Fest hosted a Buffy the Vampire Slayer reunion. Carpenter attended the event alongside Buffy creator Joss Whedon, producers Marti Noxon and David Greenwalt, and other Buffy alumni, including Sarah Michelle Gellar, Nicholas Brendon, James Marsters, Emma Caulfield, Amber Benson, Seth Green, and Michelle Trachtenberg.

Carpenter has starred in an assortment of made-for-TV and direct-to-video films, including the sex comedy What Boys Like, the horror film Voodoo Moon, and the romantic comedies See Jane Date and Relative Chaos on ABC Family (the latter of which co-starred fellow Buffy alumnus Nicholas Brendon). She also appeared in the original films Flirting with Danger and Cheaters' Club (both 2006), both on Lifetime and the Syfy original film House of Bones broadcast in 2010, around the same time as her guest spot in Legend of the Seeker.

In 2009, Carpenter starred in production company Red Sparrow's first film, Psychosis, which was released on January 11, 2011. In August 2010, she had a supporting role in Sylvester Stallone's The Expendables. After the success of The Expendables, Carpenter was cast in Human Factor and in the indie thriller Crash Site. She appeared in an episode of the seventh season of Supernatural alongside Buffy co-star James Marsters. In 2012, Carpenter landed a recurring role as Rebecca Sewell in the first season of ABC Family drama series The Lying Game. She was upgraded to a series regular for the second season. Later in the same year, she reprised her role as Lacy in The Expendables 2.

On August 28, 2013, Surviving Evil (original working title: I Survived Evil) debuted on Investigation Discovery, with Carpenter as host; in the premiere episode, Carpenter herself was featured as a crime survivor, revisiting the horrific attack her two friends and she suffered at the hands of violent serial rapist and police officer Henry Hubbard, Jr., on San Diego's Torrey Pines State Beach in 1991. She starred in the 2015 erotic film Bound, alongside Morgan Obenreder, which received a lukewarm reception. She later led the 2016 television film Mommy's Secret.

In 2025, Carpenter announced her new re-watch podcast called, The Bitch Is Back! where she will watch for the first-time every episode of Buffy the Vampire Slayer and Angel.

== Public image ==
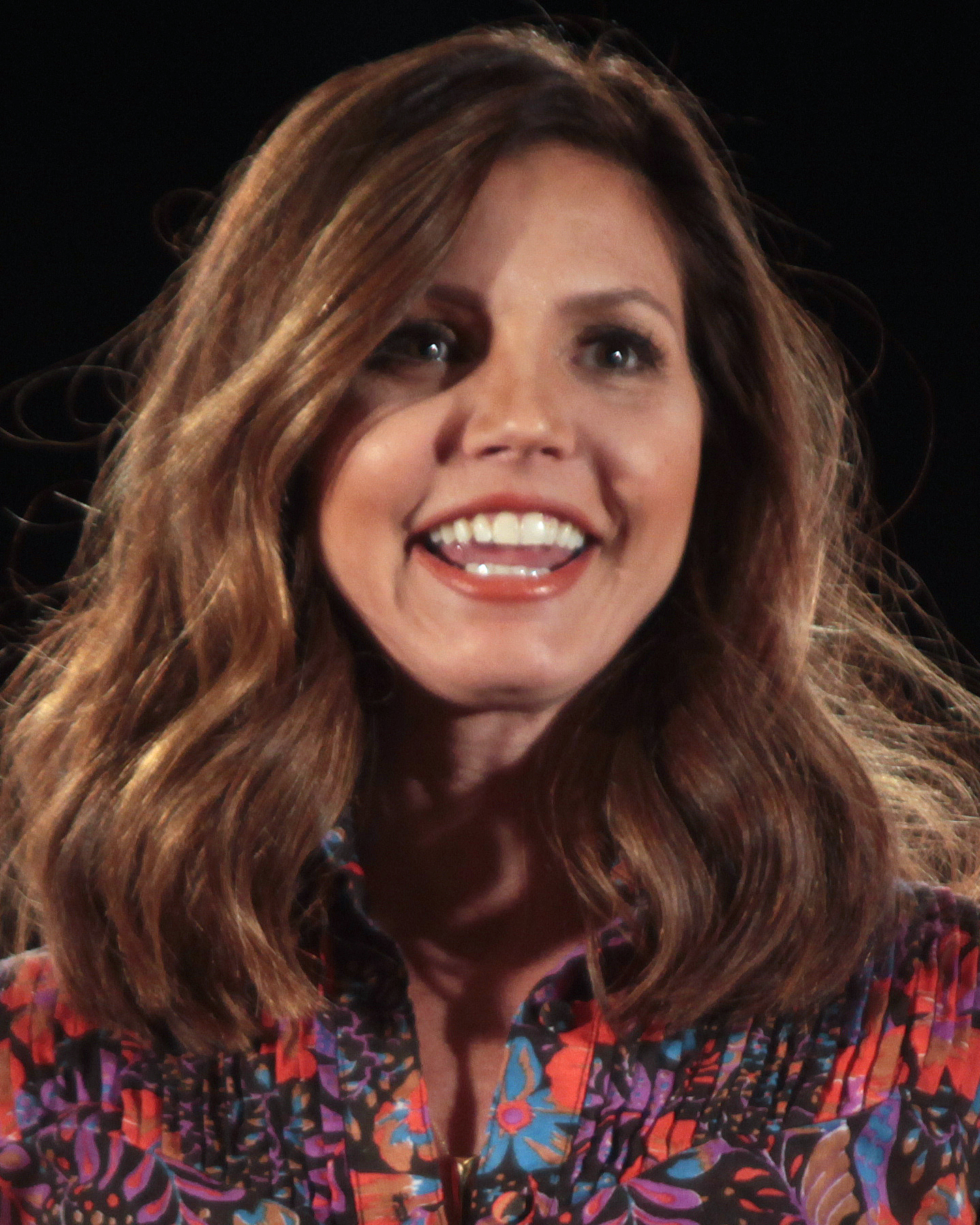
Carpenter in 2016

Carpenter was named number 31 on AskMen's Top 99 Most Desirable Women 2002 and No. 44 on their 2005 list. Despite this, Carpenter has stated she does not view herself as a sex symbol.

Carpenter appeared on the cover and in a 10-page nude pictorial of the June 2004 issue of Playboy magazine. When she was asked by People in 2005 whether she would ever pose for Playboy again, she replied, "I don't know. I did Playboy for a very specific reason. Not only was it a good financial move, but [also] it was about the place I was at in my life. I had just had my son, and I'd gained 50 pounds during pregnancy. I wanted to get back to my old self. I wanted to feel desirable and sexy. So I thought, 'What if I went full throttle'?"

== Personal life ==
Carpenter married Damian Hardy on October 5, 2002, in her hometown of Las Vegas. In March 2003, Carpenter gave birth to a son, Donovan Charles Hardy. In late 2007, the couple separated and their divorce was finalized on July 8, 2008. Carpenter is Catholic.

In February 2021, Carpenter spoke out against director Joss Whedon in support of Ray Fisher, who claimed to have experienced a toxic environment at the hands of Whedon on the set of Justice League, accusing Whedon of dismissing her from Angel in 2003 because of her pregnancy. She added that she had participated in the investigation of Whedon's behavior towards Fisher on the set of Justice League.

== Filmography ==
=== Film ===
Year	Title	Role	Notes
1995	Josh Kirby... Time Warrior!: Chapter 1, Planet of the Dino-Knights	Beth Sullivan	Direct to video
1995	Josh Kirby... Time Warrior!: Chapter 2, the Human Pets	Beth Sullivan	Direct to video
1996	Josh Kirby... Time Warrior!: Chapter 6, Last Battle for the Universe	Beth Sullivan	Direct to video
2003	What Boys Like	Kim	
2010	Psychosis	Susan Golden	
2010	The Expendables	Lacy	
2012	The Expendables 2	Lacy	
2012	Heaven's Door	Julie	
2015	Bound	Michelle Mulan	
2015	Street Level	Sydney	
2016	Girl in Woods	Momma	
2018	Mail Order Monster	Sydney Hart	
2018	The Griddle House	Mae-Bee	
2019	Pegasus: Pony with a Broken Wing	Melanie Killian	
2023	Hold You So Tight	Stephanie Mendelbaum	

=== Television ===
Year	Title	Role	Notes
1994	Baywatch	Wendie Sanders	Episode: "Air Buchannon"
1995	Boy Meets World	Caterer	Episode: "Train of Fools"
1996	Malibu Shores	Ashley Green	Main role
1997–1999	Buffy the Vampire Slayer	Cordelia Chase	Main role
1999–2004	Angel	Cordelia Chase	Main role
1999	Hey Arnold!	Simone	Voice role; episode: "Phoebe Skips"
2001	Strange Frequency	Jules	Episode: "Don't Fear the Reaper"
2003	See Jane Date	Jane Grant	TV movie
2003	Miss Match	Serena Lockner	4 episodes
2004	The Division	Emma Campbell	Episode: "Now I Lay Me Down to Sleep"
2004	Like Cats and Dogs	Sarah Hayes	TV movie
2004	LAX	Julie Random	Episode: "Thanksgiving"
2004	Charmed	Kyra	3 episodes
2005–2006	Veronica Mars	Kendall Casablancas	Recurring role
2006	Flirting with Danger	Laura Clifford	TV movie
2006	Voodoo Moon	Heather	TV movie
2006	Cheaters' Club	Linda Stern	TV movie
2006	Relative Chaos	Katherine	TV movie
2007	Back to You	Brooke Schimmel	Episode: "Gracie's Bully"
2007–2009 & 2011	Greek	Tegan Walker	4 episodes
2008	Big Shots	Janelle Johns	Episodes: "The Better Man" and "Who's the Boss?"
2009	CSI: Crime Scene Investigation	Mink	Episode: "The Descent of Man"
2009	Legend of the Seeker	Triana	Episode: "Marked"
2010	House of Bones	Heather Burton	TV movie
2011	Crash Site: A Family in Danger	Rita Saunders	TV movie
2011	Deadly Sibling Rivalry	Janna / Callie	TV movie
2011	Burn Notice	Nicki Skyler	Episode: "Better Halves"
2011	A Trusted Man	Sonia Paston	TV movie
2011	Supernatural	Maggie Stark	Episode: "Shut Up, Dr. Phil"
2012	Ghostquake	Persia the Librarian	TV movie
2012–2013	The Lying Game	Rebecca Sewell	Main role
2013–2016	Surviving Evil	Herself	Series host and co-executive producer; also episode: "Terror Beach"
2013	Blue Bloods	Marianne Romano	Episode: "Growing Boys"
2014	Sons of Anarchy	Carol	Episode: "Red Rose"
2015	A Horse Tail	Samantha Harrison	TV movie
2015	Scream Queens	Mrs. Herfmann	Episode: "Chainsaw"
2016	Chicago P.D.	Brianna Logan	Episodes: "A Night Owl" & "Forty-Caliber Bread Crumb"
2016	I Like You Just the Way I Am	Patty	
2016	Lucifer	Jamie Lee Adrienne	Episode: "The Weaponizer"
2016	Mommy's Secret	Anne Harding	TV movie
2017	Criminal Minds: Beyond Borders	Dani Gates	Episode: "Abominable"
2017	Battle of the Network Stars	Herself	Contestant; "Sci-Fi/Fantasy" team
2019	9-1-1	Maude	Episode: "This Life We Choose"
2019	No Good Nick	Jacquelyn	
2019	Pandora	Eve	Episode: "Simple Twist of Fate"
2021	The Good Father: The Martin MacNeill Story	Michele MacNeill	TV movie
2022	Going Home	Katherine Sumner	4 episodes
2022	Dynasty	Heather	Episode: "There's No One Around to Watch You Drown"
2025	The Doctor with Two Faces	Dr. Joan Unger	TV movie
2026	The Dating App Nightmare	Rena	TV movie

=== Internet ===
Year	Title	Role	Notes
2025–present	The Bitch Is Back	Herself	Podcaster. Lead role

=== Video games ===
Year	Role	Notes
2002	Buffy the Vampire Slayer	Cordelia Chase
