= The Worst Witch (disambiguation) =

The Worst Witch is a series of children's novels by Jill Murphy.

The Worst Witch may also refer to:

- The Worst Witch (film), a 1986 British television film based on the novels
- The Worst Witch (1998 TV series)
  - Weirdsister College, a sequel series to the 1998 television series
  - The New Worst Witch, a spin-off series to the 1998 television series
- The Worst Witch (2017 TV series)
