= List of The Worst Witch (2017 TV series) episodes =

Episodes of fantasy drama children's television series

The Worst Witch is a fantasy drama children's television series about a group of young witches at a Magic Academy. The series is based on the novel series of the same name by Jill Murphy, rebooting the 1998 television series and its spin-offs. The international co-production between CBBC, ZDF and Netflix premiered in 2017, and it has been released over the course of four series.

== Series overview ==
Series	Episodes	Originally released	
Series	Episodes	First released	Last released
1	13	11 January 2017	29 March 2017
2	13	8 January 2018	26 March 2018
3	13	7 January 2019	25 March 2019
4	13	27 January 2020	20 April 2020

== Episodes ==
=== Series 1 (2017) ===
No. overall	No. in series	Title	Directed by	Written by	Original release date	UK viewers (millions)
1	1	"Selection Day"	Brian Grant	Emma Reeves	11 January 2017	0.465
2	2	"Selection Day"	Brian Grant	Emma Reeves	11 January 2017	0.465
Maud Spellbody, a young witch, is flying on her broomstick to Cackle's Academy for Selection Day. She crashes into Mildred Hubble's balcony. Mildred helps Maud, whose glasses were broken in the crash, get to the school. A new student there, Ethel Hallow makes a good first impression on the teachers. The girls tell Miss Hardbroom that Mildred was supposed to attend Pentangle's, but decided Cackle is better. Esmerelda Hallow, Ethel's older sister, gives the students a tour and Miss Cackle helps Mildred cope with the effects of a transfer spell. When Mildred and Maud sneak away, Ethel eavesdrops and learns Mildred is not from a magical family. Later, Mildred struggles with the written exam. Miss Cackle encourages her to do what she is good at. Being good at art, she draws pictures instead of writing answers, and only receives a 1% grade. Miss Cackle gives her twin sister, Agatha, permission to speak to Miss Hardbroom for an internet article. The students make potions and Mildred successfully levitates, after taking some of Ethel's pondweed from her dragon potion (due to Ethel having taken all of it), wrongly turning Ethel into a worm. First appearances: Bella Ramsey as Mildred Hubble, Meibh Campbell as Maud Spellbody, Jenny Richardson as Ethel Hallow, Miriam Petche as Esmerelda Hallow, Tallulah Milligan as Drusilla Paddock, Dagny Rollins as Felicity Foxglove, Clare Higgins as Miss Ada Cackle/Agatha Cackle, Raquel Cassidy as Miss Hecate Hardbroom, Wendy Craig as Miss Bat, Shauna Shim as Miss Drill, Kacey Ainsworth as Miss Gullet, Zita Sattar as Miss Tapioca and Nicola Stephenson as Julie Hubble Note: Episode 1 and 2 aired in a 1 hour episode.
3	3	"Tabby"	Brian Grant	Emma Reeves	18 January 2017	0.334
On their first day, Mildred's phone is confiscated by Miss Hardbroom. The first years are assigned their houses and Maud is made head of the first years. The first years receive their cats and have their first flying lesson. Mildred's cat, Tabby, is scared of flying and causes her, Maud, and Ethel to crash into trees. Miss Hardbroom decides to arrange a flying test for the class and Ethel tells Esmerelda she will help Mildred. When Mildred tries to train Tabby, Ethel offers to help and pours a bit of sardine juice on the broom tail. Ethel and Mildred pass their test, whilst Maud struggles with Midnight, however, Miss Hardbroom reveals Mildred and Maud's cats have been switched and Mildred is told she will be expelled. Mildred and Maud try to find evidence that Ethel was responsible and they find the sardine tin and try it and they switch bodies. Maud is sent to Mildred's room by Miss Hardbroom unbeknownst to her. The following day, Miss Cackle finds Tabby with a notebook belonging to Ethel. Ethel admits to switching the cats, but that it was to help Mildred, and Esmerelda backs her up. Ethel is forgiven and Mildred is kept on at the school, still on a trial basis.
4	4	"New Girl"	Brian Grant	Emma Reeves	25 January 2017	0.322
The first years try out their magic tablets "maglets" and Enid arrives at school with her famous parents. Maud is sent to Miss Cackle for drawing a funny picture of Miss Hardbroom and Ethel. Miss Cackle allows Maud to convert a space under the stairs for her class. Mildred is amused by Enid singing out of tune and Enid picks Mildred to look after her whilst Ethel swaps her maglet with Maud's. Mildred ignores messages she believes are from Ethel. Enid shows Mildred her pet monkey, Muddles. Maud is hurt that Mildred is spending time with Enid and Muddles escapes, but who ends up in Miss Cackle's study. In potions, Mildred and Enid are cauldron partners and they make an invisibility potion instead of a laughter potion. Mildred attempts to make friends with Maud by, but she unknowingly reveals hers and Enid's plan to get Muddles out of Miss Cackle's study over their maglets. Mildred and Enid get to the study and Enid's monkey is actually a cat and Maud and Drusilla help Mildred and Enid escape. Miss Hardbroom is annoyed with Ethel when the room is empty. Maud confiscates Ethel's maglet and Enid makes friends with Maud. First appearance: Tamara Smart as Enid Nightshade Guest starring: Holly Quin-Ankrah as Mrs Nightshade, and Jonathan Ojinnaka as Mr Nightshade
5	5	"Pond Life"	Sallie Aprahamian	Neil Jones	1 February 2017	0.281
Mildred and Enid jump on the fields, which they have made bouncy, not caring about studying for spell science with Miss Gullet. Mildred receives her first ever toy, a teddy named Puss, from her mum in the post. In spell science, Mildred is asked to turn a rat into a frog and Maud refuses to help. Mildred turns Ethel into a pig and when Miss Hardbroom finds out, she gives Mildred until later that day to perform a simple transformation spell or she will leave the school. Mildred decides to leave of her own accord, but is tricked into meeting Ethel by Drusilla and Ethel turns her into a frog. Mildred ends up by the pond and meets another frog, Algernon Rowan-Webb. Maud refuses to let Enid help her find Mildred, despite Enid reassuring her that she is Mildred's best friend. Mildred and Algernon get into the school and end up in jars in the potions lab. Maud reveals Ethel has done something to Mildred to the teachers and Enid finds out she is one of the frogs. Ethel is forced to turn her back to herself and Mildred reveals the identity of the other frog and it turns out Miss Gullet was responsible in order to get her job. Miss Gullet is forced to turn Algernon back to his human form and once she has done so, she is dismissed. Algernon persuades Mildred to take the test and she performs a multi-transformation spell, impressing Miss Cackle and Miss Bat. Ethel and Miss Gullet are turned into frogs and Mr Rowan-Webb becomes the new spell science teacher. First appearance: Philip Martin Brown as Algernon Rowan-Webb
6	6	"The Great Wizard's Visit"	Sallie Aprahamian	Madeleine Brettingham	8 February 2017	0.408
The Great Wizard visits Cackle's Academy and he meets the pupils. The Great Wizard talks through recent incidents caused by Mildred and when The Great Wizard finds out Mildred is not from a witch family and Miss Cackle defends Mildred against the Great Wizard. Mildred has to do a magic display for The Great Wizard. Ethel shows The Great Wizard the school trophies and Ethel tells The Great Wizard about Mildred. Enid tells Mildred she suspects Ethel wrote the letter to The Great Wizard, after overhearing her talk to him. It turns out Agatha is pretending to be Miss Cackle, as Miss Cackle is in a deep sleep. Mildred performs her magic display, a beaker and bottle band, but she messes up when the potions explode over the staff and The Great Wizard insists Miss Cackle leaves. He allows Miss Cackle to stay after the staff persuade him and Mildred is chosen to be the lead in a broomstick display for The Great Wizard and Ethel has to lend her broom to Mildred. Mildred reveals to Maud that Miss Cackle is Agatha when she tries to perform a spell on Mildred and Maud wakes Miss Cackle up. Miss Cackle proves she is the real Miss Cackle by saving Mildred and Enid from crashing. Guest starring: Nicholas Jones as Great Wizard
7	7	"The Best Teacher"	Sallie Aprahamian	Nick Leather	15 February 2017	0.296
The pupils call home and Ethel is hurt when her mum can't spare the time to speak to her, after spending ages talking to Esmerelda. Ethel is horrible to Mildred, making remarks on how she is always bottom and Mildred decides she won't be any longer. Enid suggests Mildred does a wisdom spell and during the night, Mildred takes Miss Bat's socks for the spell and after thinking it was goblins, Miss Cackle and Miss Hardbroom decide to give her some time off. Mildred makes the spell, but thinks it hasn't worked, however, the following morning, Maud finds Mildred looking old. Maud tries to look for a reversal spell, but Esmerelda informs her that only time can undo a wisdom spell. Maud encounters Miss Darkside, the supply teacher who is not nice, and she takes her to Mildred, pretending she is Miss Cackle and to tell Miss Darkside she is no longer required. Miss Cackle mistakes Mildred for Miss Darkside and Mildred has to teach her class, pretending that the absence of her younger self is because of her mum's toenails and she sends Ethel and Drusilla out of class, impressing Miss Hardbroom. Mildred gets the class to act out a story. Ethel and Drusilla phone Miss Hubble and they find out nothing is wrong with her and Ethel takes the information to Mildred. After Miss Cackle decides to phone Miss Hubble, Mildred decides to admit what's happened, but the spell wears off as she enters Miss Cackle's office. Miss Cackle magics Miss Hubble to her office and Maud makes an ingrown toenail spell. Mildred gets the result from a test, where she placed second bottom. Ethel tells Mildred she impersonated a teacher so she tells Ethel she phoned her mum, and Ethel walks off, and Mildred and Maud think Mildred's mum is a witch as the spell has worked on her. Guest starring: Emma Handy as Mrs Hallow, Rachel Bell as Old Mildred and Kitty Martin as Miss Darkside
8	8	"Maud's Big Mistake"	Lindy Heymann	Neil Jones	22 February 2017	0.315
The parents visit the school to have a talk with the teachers on how their children are doing. Maud wants her parents to be proud of her, so she makes everyone forget about her mistakes. The problem: Mildred forgets her as well, since all of her mistakes where only due to Mildred. So she decides to not be a flawless pupil but to get her best friend back. His father is erasing the memories of the teachers as well, and everything turns out good. Her parents are still proud of her, even though she is not perfect. Guest starring: Jonathan Ojinnaka as Mr Nightshade, Emma Handy as Mrs Hallow, Henry Miller as Mr Spellbody and Lynsey Anne Moffatt as Mrs Spellbody
9	9	"The First Witch"	Lindy Heymann	Maxine Alderton	1 March 2017	0.240
Mildred tries to find out if she is the only witch in the family. The school archives indicates that there has not been a Hubble attending the school before her. Ethel and Mildred do not get along well, so Ethel's big sister has a plan. Mildred hair grows longer than expected and is nearly killing them, but together Ethel, Mildred and their friends manage the problem. A secret path opens, and they start their own coven.
10	10	"Spelling Bee"	Lindy Heymann	Matt Evans	8 March 2017	0.329
Mildred and Ethel are the chosen ones for a competition against another school in potion making. Mildred is told to do nothing at all under the competition, which makes her a little sad. The headmistress of the other school, Miss Pentangle, knows how it is to be overlooked, and she offers Mildred a place at her school—she sees her potential. At the end of the competition, she finds a rule that activates Mildred in the potion making. Mildred does great, as Miss Pentangle had expected. Mildred chooses not to leave Cackle's Academy, but is grateful for the offer. Miss Pentangle and Miss Hardbroom were friends once, and Mildred helps both of them to become friends again. Guest Starring: Amanda Holden as Miss Pentangle, Max True as Zac Hawthorn, and Ellie Daley as Sapphire Hailstone.
11	11	"The Mists of Time"	Dirk Campbell	Nick Leather	15 March 2017	0.315
Mrs Cackle is barricading the school after it has been surrounded by mist. It is the mist of time, created by a mighty sorcerer who afterwards got lost in "the mists of time". Ethel's cat is gone missing outside, so Mildred helps her getting outside the castle, searching for her cat. They do not find the cat, and the re-enter the castle a different way than they left it. If they would have re-entered the same way, they would have been back in their own time. But now they have traveled back in time. They meet Mona (Maud's grandma) and the Cackle twin sisters, Agatha and Ada. Mildred finds out that Ada (the regular Miss Cackle) is not the oldest one and therefore should not have been the head of the school in the future. Furthermore, she figures out that Ada is not a good witch and tries to steal her twin sister's power. Suddenly, the old Mrs Cackle enters the scene and helps Mildred to make herself a non-naughty witch and fixing the past by not expelling Mona. Both Mildred, Ethel, and Ada find their way back to their own time. Mildred concludes that she might become the best witch, since even Ada, the naughtiest witch, has become the best witch. Absent: Zita Sattar as Mrs Tapioca Guest starring: Clare Gower as Young Ada, Sarah Gower as Young Agatha and Gillian Waugh as Mrs Cackle
12	12	"Out Of Bounds"	Dirk Campbell	Emma Reeves	22 March 2017	0.268
The first years do growth spells, but Mildred has gone wrong and shrinks instead and Miss Hardbroom reminds them of their exams the following week. Ethel tells Drusilla about the secret meetings Mildred has been having with Miss Cackle, reckoning it's about the secret scroll. Mildred vows to stay silent about the scroll. Miss Cackle goes to see her sister. Ethel makes a spell to make her look like Maud and as Maud, Ethel wants to know the truth and Mildred and Enid work out it's Ethel, but they decide to have fun. Mildred pretends to Ethel that she is Miss Cackle's niece. Miss Cackle returns from seeing her sister, but tells the staff that Agatha has escaped and Miss Hardbroom lets the students know that a protective spell has been placed on the school, that visitors have to be invited and the girls cannot leave school grounds without permission. Ethel makes a study syrup for Mildred, but Maud warns her not to take it and Ethel and Mildred end up in Miss Cackle's office and Mildred admits to saying she was Miss Cackle's niece. After being told off by Miss Cackle, Mildred confides in Maud she thinks Agatha is posing as Miss Cackle and they go to Mr Rowan-Webb and Miss Bat for help, and Maud takes Mr Rowan-Webb to Miss Cackle as a frog, but Miss Cackle turns Mr Rowan-Webb back to himself. Maud is against Mildred's suggestion of her going to Darkwood Cottage and Ethel rows with Esmerelda about feeling second best. Mildred goes to the cottage and finds Miss Cackle and Mildred is persuaded to give up her powers, but she realises that it is Agatha and does not go through with it. Mildred escapes from Agatha and Miss Gullet, who is on Agatha's side. Ethel find the birth scroll and finds out Agatha is older. Esmerelda and Ethel let Agatha and Miss Gullet into the school, thinking it's Miss Cackle and Esmerelda gives up her magic and Esmerelda finds out it was Agatha and Ethel knew it. Ethel shows Agatha the scroll and she decides to take over. Maud tells on Mildred for sneaking out of school and Miss Hardbroom expels her.
13	13	"The Worst Headmistress"	Dirk Campbell	Emma Reeves	29 March 2017	0.342
Agatha takes over the school as headmistress. Miss Gullet installs a detection spell on the entire school to make an alarm when unauthorized magic is used. Agatha claims that Ada Cackle has run away, but actually, she has been trapped in a living painting of herself by Agatha. Ethel and her sister Esmeralda discuss what to do about The Great Wizard being called to visit the castle as he will freak out. Ethel feels guilty and summons Miss Gullet, who transforms Esmeralda into a trophy. Ethel sends Mildred's cat Tabby to Mildred's home, with an invisibility spell and tells her she needs to come and save the castle – Mildred uses a kitchen sweep instead of a broomstick and decides to go. Mildred breaks into Cackle's office where the painting of the Cackle sisters is, finding Maud, Enid and Ethel trying to help Ada, but Miss Gullet enters and transforms the visible girls into cakes for a great feast in the main hall, while Mildred's invisibility wears off. The Great Wizard arrives, and hears of Agatha's evil doings via Mrs Bat and Mr Rowan-Webb. Miss Gullet sees them grassing up and transforms them into frogs. Agatha, Miss Hardbroom and Miss Gullet transform the Great Wizard into a balloon. Miss Hardbroom tries to get Ada out of the painting, but Miss Gullet and Agatha hear the unauthorised magic alarm and send Miss Hardbroom into the painting as well. Meanwhile, Mildred stops the witches transformed into cakes from being eaten by the other girls. Mildred rises up against Ada and asks all the girls to vote, agreeing that none of the girls will stay at the school if Agatha is headmistress, so Agatha casts an Annihilation spell to destroy the castle and everyone in it. Miss Drill attempts to hold it back while the girls escape. With the castle crumbling down, Mildred starts chanting and brings all the girls into a circle and casts an incredibly powerful spell that reverses all of Agatha's evil magic and turns everyone back to themselves again. The Great Wizard traps Agatha and Miss Gullet into a photograph of them both, which Ada hangs up in her office for the rest of time. Mildred just scrapes by on her exams with 51%, ending the school year. Final appearances: Tallulah Milligan as Drusilla Paddock and Kacey Ainsworth as Miss Gullet

=== Series 2 (2018) ===
No. overall	No. in series	Title	Directed by	Written by	Original release date	UK viewers (millions)
14	1	"Tortoise Trouble"	Dirk Campbell	Maxine Alderton	8 January 2018	0.301
Mildred makes her way to school for her second year feeling positive and impresses Maud and Enid with her flying. On her way, her school project is blown away and Ethel accompanies her younger sister Sybil for her first day. Mildred's project lands on Ethel and new first years Clarice Twigg and Beatrice Bunch meet each other. Mildred finds Ethel with her project on making animals talk on the roof and Mildred slips off the roof. Hanging on by a flag pole, Sybil summons Mildred's broomstick to her, but part of the school falls down when Mildred casts a spell to help get her down and the staff find out some of Agatha's bad magic was left behind. Clarice is made head of the first year and she and Beatrice make friends with Sybil when they have to share a room. Mildred hides her talking tortoise and project whilst Ethel has lost hers. Maud tells Mildred and Enid that her physical appearance changed during a game of magic hide and seek. Beatrice gives Sybil a confidence potion and when Ethel has a go at Sybil for not packing her project, Sybil stands up to Ethel. The second years present their projects to Miss Hardbroom and Mildred is frustrated when Ethel does a spell on making animals talk, which Ethel stole from Mildred and when Mildred replicates the spell to prove Ethel stole it, Miss Hardbroom sends Mildred to Miss Cackle. Mildred ends up on the roof with the staff, who find the founding stone and Sybil rescues Mildred's tortoise from a high tree, who hand it over to Maud and Enid to prove Mildred did her project on talking animals. Beatrice reveals to Sybil that the potion was just water and Miss Cackle shows off the founding stone to the school. The tortoise tells Miss Cackle and Miss Hardbroom what Ethel did and they find Mildred's project in the bin, like the tortoise said and Mildred wins a prize for her project. First appearances: Trixie Hyde as Sybil Hallow, Kitty Slack as Clarice Twigg and Ynez Williams as Beatrice Bunch Note: First appearance of Megan Hughes as Maud Spellbody
15	2	"The Friendship Trap"	Dirk Campbell	Maxine Alderton	15 January 2018	0.315
Everyone is woken by a fire drill and Mildred sees Miss Hardbroom on fire, so she throws a bucket of water over her. When Mildred and Ethel insult each other, Miss Cackle leaves an orange handprint on their backs. Whilst the students observe the founding stone, Mildred and Ethel find out about the handprint when Ethel temporarily turns Mildred into stone. After surveying a package outside, Miss Bat opens it, which turns out to be stone, but later, eyes appear. Mildred and Ethel become joined together by the arm, which Miss Cackle reveals is a friendship trap that will only undo when they make friends and Sybil refuses to leave her room after recent events. In Art, the stone turns into the new teacher, Miss Mould and when Mildred is complimented on her clay work, Ethel turns it into snakes and when Miss Mould changes the spell, they class are covered in clay and erupt into laughter, which Miss Hardbroom is unhappy with. Beatrice's asthma transports her and Sybil to different places around the school whilst the friendship trap begins to wear off between Mildred and Ethel when they talk about Esmerelda having no magical powers. The founding stone ends up in Sybil's possession and to return the stone, Clarice suggests they start a fire to set off the alarm to enable them to return the stone. When the staff find out the stone is missing, they organise a search. When the fire alarm goes off, Sybil is scared and Mildred helps Ethel in reassuring her and the friendship trap breaks. Miss Hardbroom confiscates Sybil, Clarice and Beatrice's cats for the fire. Ethel refuses to help Sybil return the founding stone, but Mildred agrees to. First Appearance: Mina Anwar as Miss Mould
16	3	"Ethel Everywhere"	Dirk Campbell	Nick Leather	22 January 2018	0.265
Mildred, Maud and Enid decide to put the founding stone back, but it is not in a disused bedroom and they confront Ethel, the only other person who knows where the founding stone is, but she is making a cloning potion. Enid encourages Ethel to try the potion as she wants to use it if it works and Mildred asks Sybil and Clarice about the stone's location. They find Bea in the potions lab, where she ended up after sneezing and Ethel takes the potion, which works, but the cloned Ethel causes mischief. The cloned Ethel takes Ethel's place in chanting and when Miss Bat falls asleep, the cloned Ethel puts a potion in Miss Bat's drink, causing her hair to be spiked and green, horrifying Algernon. Mildred retrieves the stone from the store cupboard with Maud, Sybil, Clarice and Bea, telling Miss Mould that Sybil is homesick, whilst Miss Hardbroom searches Miss Mould's room for the founding stone. Mildred gives the founding stone to the cloned Ethel and Mrs Hallow arrives at Cackles on Miss Mould's request about Sybil's homesickness and the fire she unintentionally caused. Mildred, Maud and Enid make an antidote for Ethel's potion from a book of Miss Bat's and when Ethel finds the cloned Ethel, who has cloned herself. Mrs Hallow is horrified when she learns of the founding stone being missing and Mildred, Maud and Enid try to work out which is the real Ethel, but work it out when the clones compliment her and Ethel does not. The founding stone is put back to the staff's relief.
17	4	"The Extraordinary Esper Vespertilio"	Dirk Campbell	Neil Jones	29 January 2018	0.226
Mildred carves a staff, but Miss Hardbroom confiscates it because she opposes Mildred using a staff due to it being used by wizards and not witches. Miss Bat reminds the second years of Esper Vespertilio visit, a great chantsmith, but they show a lack of enthusiasm. Miss Cackle gives Sybil, Clarice and Bea their cats back, but Bea sneezes and disappears again. Mildred, Maud and Enid chase a girl who has other students uniform, but it turns out to be a boy; The Great Wizard's grandson, Ollie. Bea admits she is not asthmatic, but allergic to cats and Ollie tells Mildred, Maud and Enid that the magic he wants to learn is not taught at wizard school. He also tells them he would like to meet Esper Vespertilio due to his liking of chanting and Bea uses a vanishing potion to get rid of asthma, but she accidentally makes her cat Solstice disappear. Miss Bat tells Mildred and Ollie, who is disguised as a girl, that she cancelled Esper's visit due to lack of interest, so Mildred decides to get people to come by using Ollie's Esper Vespertilio's record. In order to get her cat back, Bea uses magic scissors to create a vanishment hole, but everything that has gone into vanishment reappears and Esper's show goes ahead, though the students are amazed that Miss Bat is Esper. Sybil, Clarice and Bea struggle to keep the vanished things away but they fail. When Ollie performs as a girl, he receives praise from The Great Wizard, but he is horrified when he finds out it is Ollie. Mildred makes a point about gender equality and then the great hall is filled with the inrushing vanished things. Mildred catches her staff from the vanished things and uses her it to prevent The Great Wizard being attacked by the vanished things. Mildred's speech prompts The Great Wizard to allow Ollie to have chanting lessons, and to allow Mildred to keep and use her staff. Bea is delighted when Miss Cackle cures her allergy. Mildred is never seen with her staff again for the rest of the series, and she is amazed to find Miss Hardbroom using a staff.
18	5	"Mildred's Family Tree"	Dirk Campbell	Zoe Lister	5 February 2018	0.210
In Art, the second years draw and then magic family trees and Mildred's side only includes her maternal family as she does not know her father, which leads Mildred into thinking of him. In assembly, Miss Drill announces an upcoming sports day, starting with the second years and Maud is determined not to take part due to previous sports days at her old school. Ethel agrees not to tell on Mildred, Maud and Enid when they use unauthorised magic to try and figure out who Mildred's father is and upon returning to see her tree, she is shocked to see Algernon on the tree and believes he is her grandfather. Mildred backs out of asking him whether they are related, but he helps her prepare for sports day. Maud takes a potion to make her look ill in order to get out of sports day, however, she turns purple after taking too much. When Miss Drill finds out about Maud pretending to be sick, she shares her humiliating sports experiences from when she was young and Mildred is left devastated when Algernon tells Mildred that he cannot be her grandfather as he has no children and that Ethel put Algernon on her tree as a joke. Mildred takes Maud's place in the fly high using a magic pole, resulting in her ending up in a pond and Algernon magics Mildred to the Art room, where her mum is. Julie describes Mildred's dad, who was a trainee plumber named Dave and his characteristics, though Mildred decides she does not want to find him. Maud is delighted when she does not come in last place for hurdling and Mildred is happy with the family she has, which includes Maud and Enid.
19	6	"Bat Girl"	Unknown	Unknown	12 February 2018	0.244
The school prepares for its career day and Enid is disappointed when her mum tells her that she will not be coming as she has a show. When Mildred comforts her, she tells Enid that she will probably see her mum when she gets into trouble and the following morning, the students are summoned to the kitchen by Miss Hardbroom, where toilet roll is flying around, causing Mrs Tapioca to smash her favourite day and Enid immediately takes responsibility. Clarice does not understand why Sybil and Bea are impressed and Enid tells Mildred that she gave her the idea to misbehave in order to see her mum. Miss Cackle and Miss Hardbroom tell Enid that the careers day has been cancelled, so no student will see their parents as well as being threatened with expulsion and Enid is hurt because Mildred is upset about not seeing her mum. Ethel locks Mildred in her room when Mildred overhears Ethel and Felicity plan to sabotage Enid's assessments, however, Enid receives praise from Miss Mould when Ethel's paint spilling spell causes a sunset on her work. Mildred turns herself into a bat to escape while Enid fails chanting when Ethel causes her to chant in reverse. Mildred finds out what Ethel is doing to Enid and causes Ethel to smash the potion bottle and Enid passes Spell Science. Maud and Enid find out Mildred is a bat and a furious Miss Hardbroom is angry that Enid and Maud skipped potions to turn Mildred back. Enid does not want to tell Miss Cackle about what Ethel did as she caused the cancellation of careers day. Meanwhile, desperate to prove to Sybil and Beatrice that she has a sense of humour, Clarice organises a prank designed to slime them both. Unfortunately for Clarice, her prank slimes Ethel and Felicity instead, with Miss Hardbroom seeing everything! Enid receives praise from Miss Cackle for helping Mildred and when she contacts her mum, Miss Nightshade tells Enid she is proud of her.
20	7	"Hollow Wood"	Dermot Boyd	Matt Sinclair	19 February 2018	0.188
The second years are collecting potion ingredients under the supervision of Miss Mould following an incident involving Mildred and Enid. Apart from Mildred, the second years show reluctance at going into Hollow Wood due to it being enchanted, but Miss Mould encourages them to. Esmerelda returns to the school for a visit, delighting Sybil, but Clarice unintentionally hurts Sybil by bringing up the fact that Esmerelda no longer is magic. Whilst collecting ravens feather with Ethel, Felicity is put into a trance state and Clarice will not apologise to Sybil unless she apologises first. After meeting with Esmerelda, Miss Cackle wants to give Esmerelda a position at the school due to not fitting into a non-magic world, but Miss Hardbroom advises Miss Cackle against it due to it not being fair on Esmerelda being surrounded by magic. Mildred. Maud and Ethel have to make a disenchantment potion when Miss Mould is also found in a trance state and Mr Hallow, the father of Esmerelda, Ethel and Sybil, arrives at the school after not knowing of Esmerelda's visit. Over a game of netball, Esmerelda reassures Sybil she will be fine without magic and encourages Sybil and Clarice to be friends again. She later reassures Miss Cackle and Mildred and Maud successfully disenchant Felicity, Miss Mould and Ethel and Ethel is angry with Mildred upon her return to school when she sees Esmerelda leaves with their dad.
21	8	"Miss Cackle's Birthday"	Dermot Boyd	Matt Evans	26 February 2018	0.298
Maud is acting as director for Miss Cackle's show for her birthday, but Maud is miserable when her best act is not that good. When Sybil, Clarice and Bea practise their broom dance, Ethel has a go at Sybil and Miss Hardbroom shows Miss Cackle a newspaper article about the recent failings at Cackles. Miss Hardbroom magics the second year to the potion lab when they spend their lesson practising for their show and when Maud contemplates resigning as director, Mildred and Enid work on a happiness potion for Maud and when she takes it, Maud turns into a baby, the last time she was happy. Miss Hardbroom cancels potions class when Miss Cackle frets about the mistakes and believes she should quit; she also appoints Ethel as director in place of Maud. When baby Maud causes a mess, Miss Bat takes her when Enid tidies up and Ethel decides that the show will be an instrumentless orchestra instead of individual acts. Enid discovers baby Maud is in the potions lab when she magically transports herself to the pond and everyone walks out from the orchestra. Mildred confesses to Miss Cackle about Maud and when she summons Enid and baby Maud, she changes Maud back. At the show, Ethel's solo orchestra fails to impress, so Mildred gets Sybil, Clarice and Bea to perform their broom dance, Felicity to dance and she, Maud and Enid perform a sketch as Miss Hardbroom, Miss Cackle and Miss Drill as well as performing the school song. The Great Wizard tells Miss Cackle she has been summoned to an emergency meeting after failing to respond to Mrs Hallow.
22	9	"Miss Softbroom"	Delyth Thomas	Diane Whitley	5 March 2018	0.270
Miss Hardbroom is acting as headmistress in Miss Cackle's absence and the second years have to do a run before having smoked salmon for breakfast. Mildred eavesdrops outside the staff room, where she overhears Miss Hardbroom telling the staff Miss Cackle has been summoned to a disciplinary hearing at the magic council and the school is being inspected by Miss Doomstone later that day. Mildred tells Maud and Enid and when Miss Bat falls asleep while covering potions class, Mildred, Maud and Enid sneak off to the magic council to show support for Miss Cackle. In the first years potion class, Miss Hardbroom upsets Sybil when she makes a mistake with her colour changing potion, causing her cauldron to explode, so Bea decides to make a personality changing potion for Miss Hardbroom. Mildred, Maud and Enid gain access into the magic council ground and hide as The Great Wizard points out Miss Cackle's failings. Bea gives Miss Hardbroom the potion, which works when Bea suggests the class have fun and Miss Hardbroom makes jokes at Ethel and Felicity. Mrs. Hallow blames Miss Cackle for Esmerelda losing her powers while Miss Hardbroom lets the class sing their potion recipes as well as dismissing them early. Mrs. Hallow presents a petition for parents asking Miss Cackle to be removed as headmistress and Mildred, Maud and Enid emerge, asking if they can speak in Miss Cackle's defence, which Mildred does. Sybil, Clarice and Bea work on an antidote, but Miss Hardbroom refuses to take it and after being held up, Miss Doomstone arrives to see Miss Hardbroom, but slips on frog gloop. Miss Doomstone is given a personality changing potion as Miss Hardbroom takes the antidote and Miss Doomstone informs everyone she has recommended that the school stays open. Miss Cackle arrives back and breaks the news that she will be leaving the school.
23	10	"A New Dawn"	Delyth Thomas	Kirsty Halton	12 March 2018	0.316
Miss Pentangle arrives at Cackles Academy to run some modern magic workshops, with students speculating she is the new headmistress. Mildred, Maud and Enid are upset about the prospect of all going to different schools as Maud's parents are visiting Miss Amulet's Academy and Miss Cackle continues to look at the petition. Miss Pentangle is summoned to Miss Cackle's office and admits she has been asked to be headmistress at Cackles as well as Pentangles. Miss Pentangle impresses the first years with her modern chanting and gives Mildred a power boost in order to perform an invisibility spell in potions. Sybil faints in chanting after performing a chant with confidence and Mildred confides in Miss Pentangle over wanting to get Miss Cackle reinstated. Mildred sneaks off to Miss Cackle's office during chanting to see the petition when her classmates say their parents never signed and Miss Pentangle watches Miss Cackle help Sybil with her spells and potions when she becomes emotional after struggling. With Maud and Enid's help, Mildred makes a true author potion when Maud and Enid's signatures are on the petition and when they attempt to show Miss Hardbroom, Mildred burns the scroll as her powers are strong. The Great Wizard arrives at Cackles and Mildred tells him she believes the petition signatures are forged, so using the mists of time, they find out Mrs Hallow forged the signatures. Mrs Hallow is magicked to the school and Ethel is hurt that Mrs Hallow did it out of revenge for Esmerelda and she is sacked from the council while Miss Cackle is reinstated. Guest Starring: Amanda Holden as Miss Pentangle
24	11	"Love at First Sight"	Delyth Thomas	Claire Miller	19 March 2018	0.277
On Halloween, Mildred scares Maud and Enid and with Clarice and Bea, Sybil tells them about a ghoul in one of the turrets. The next day, an emotion potion made by Mildred, Maud and Enid ends up in the drinks of all the staff when it was just intended for Miss Bat to help her and Mr Rowan-Webb make up. The potion works on Miss Mould when she begins to fall for Mr Rowan-Webb and Ethel presents Esmerelda with the school founding stone to help get her powers back. Mildred, Maud, Enid and Felicity realise they have to keep Mr Rowan-Webb away from the teachers and Ethel tells Esmerelda that the founding stone that was returned was a clone made by her. Miss Hardbroom begins to fall for Mr Rowan-Webb when Enid fails to distract her away from him, as does Miss Drill whilst Ethel explains how she cloned the stone, but Esmerelda refuses to take the powers. Miss Bat makes amends with him when the potion begins to work on her and Mr Rowan-Webb falls for himself upon seeing his reflection, so Mildred and Maud get him into a classroom by using his reflection. Esmerelda takes Mildred up on her offer on advice on normal schools, giving Ethel the importunity to put in place a spell to trap Esmerelda in her room with the founding stone. Maud fails to keep the staff away from Mr Rowan-Webb, but Mildred is able to warn Miss Cackle about the situation in time for her to negate the spell. Sybil goes into Ethel's room and is scared to be trapped in and Esmerelda is annoyed that Ethel's kindness towards her is to gain their mum's approval. Esmerelda is forced to gain powers from the stone when Sybil has climbed out of the roof and on the verge of falling, which delights Ethel, but the stone dies.
25	12	"All Hallow's Eve" "The Big Freeze"	Delyth Thomas	Neil Jones	26 March 2018	0.414
26	13	"All Hallow's Eve" "The Big Freeze"	Delyth Thomas	Neil Jones	26 March 2018	0.414
(All Hallow's Eve) Esmerelda attempts to give the powers back to the stone, but fails. Miss Cackle allows the pupils to play magical tricks on the staff without fear on Halloween. Esmerelda and Sybil recall a bedtime story from when they were younger about one of their ancestors reigniting her coven's stone, so using the Hallow family tree, Mildred asks for the Hallow responsible for that to come forward and tell them what to do, but they fly away. Miss Hardbroom struggles to get Miss Mould's references from the school she used to teach at while Mildred, Maud, Enid and Ethel try to get the answers out the Hallow ancestors. When they find the Hallow who reignited the stone, the Hallow tells them she just took credit for it. Clarice and Beatrice are convinced the magic in the school has gone haywire and eventually Esmerelda and Sybil are forced to admit that Esmerelda has got her magic back by taking it from the Stone. When Miss Drill notices the school is freezing, Miss Cackle evacuates the school, but she, Miss Hardbroom, Maud, Enid and Felicity are trapped in the potions lab. Mildred returns to the family trees to get answers from the Hallows and the witch who actually reignited the Stone long ago emerges, who turns out to be Mildred's ancestor, Mirabelle Hubble. (The Big Freeze) - In the season finale, Mirabelle explains that she had to sacrifice her magic as well as 12 descendants' magic to save the stone, and Mildred is her 13th descendant, the first magical Hubble for centuries. Mildred is delighted to find out that she is from a witching family after all. Whilst Mildred's mum Julie is in the park, she is told by her miniature self to go to Cackle's. In the potions lab, Felicity is suspended in a block of ice, so Miss Cackle, Maud and Enid give the rest of their magic to Miss Hardbroom to help Mildred, putting them into ice blocks. Mildred is unhappy about leaving the school, but Miss Mould tells her about a coven Mildred could go to, where she could be individual and creative. When Miss Hardbroom gets outside, it turns out that the founding stone is still in the school and the coven Miss Mould knows off is run by Agatha. Miss Mould's plan was to allow Agatha to escape the photograph once the Stone's magic failed. Mildred praises Miss Mould as a teacher before she is frozen herself. Ethel decides to sacrifice her magic to the stone, but she is too late as when she makes a speech, Miss Hardbroom, Esmerelda and Sybil are put into ice blocks, and then she is. Julie Hubble arrives at the school and gets Mildred out of her block; Mildred explains to her mum about their ancestor. Mildred decides to sacrifice her powers to the stone, but although she starts the process, Miss Mould, moved by what Mildred said to her, completes the ritual in her place and reignites the stone, losing her powers. The school is saved and later celebrates Halloween. As the festivities unfold, Miss Cackle gives a brief, but emotional, speech to the rest of the school that while there's stuff needed to be cleaned up, they will celebrate that they are not just students and staff anymore, that they're a family. The season ends with the school applauding Miss Cackle and Mildred, for their heroic deeds. Final appearances: Miriam Petche as Esmerelda Hallow and Mina Anwar as Miss Mould

=== Series 3 (2019) ===
No. overall	No. in series	Title	Directed by	Written by	Original release date	UK viewers (millions)
27	1	"The Wishing Star"	Dirk Campbell	Neil Jones	7 January 2019	0.279
On their return to school for the new year, Mildred’s schoolwork greatly improves as she basks in newfound confidence of her witching heritage. This irks Ethel more than ever, with herself and the Hallow name facing severe scrutiny after the Founding Stone incident. She is further infuriated by Sybil, who returns to school aspiring to be more like Mildred. Mildred asks Miss Cackle to provide her Mother with magical powers, but is denied. She enters the Great Wizard's broomstick-flying contest to win a Wishing Star so she can wish her Mum magical, as does Ethel who aims to return things to the way they were before the incident. Mildred becomes frustrated that Tabby hinders her flying ability, then discovers a stray dog called Star who excels at flying and chooses him for the competition instead, which goes against Cackles’ “cats only” rule. Her and Ethel clash during the competition, but the Great Wizard mistakes this for stunt flying and declares them joint-winners. Ethel attempts to expose the cheat, but Maud and Enid magically switch Star with Tabby and Ethel is disqualified, only for Mildred to confess and award the prize back to Ethel. Miss Cackle and Miss Hardbroom however confiscate the Wishing Star, feeling neither of them are worthy of its powers. During the subsequent meeting with Mildred’s Mum, Miss Cackle does not grant her magical powers but does employ her as the new art teacher.
28	2	"Double Hubble"	Dirk Campbell	Claire Miller	14 January 2019	0.162
Miss Hardbroom disagress with the decision to employ the non-magical Julie Hubble, and vows to bully her and document her every mistake. Ethel is still resentful for losing the Wishing Star, and takes advantage of Clarice’s contempt for Mildred’s rule breaking to befriend her. Ethel then begins to sabotage Miss Hubble, casting a spell to bring their Venus flytrap drawings to life, only to become the victim herself and be rescued by Miss Hubble. She is punished for her actions whilst Julie is praised. Ethel manipulates her new ally Clarice into stealing the Wishing Star, only to be beaten to the prize by Mildred, who finally wishes magical powers upon her Mum hoping stop the discrimination against her.
29	3	"Magic Mum"	Dirk Campbell	Sarah Courtauld and Neil Jones	21 January 2019	0.199
After Mildred uses the stolen Wishing Star to give her mother magic, Julie has no idea how to control her amazing new powers. Meanwhile, Beatrice's attempts to learn about cooking prompt her to discover that items are being stolen from the dining hall. It also emerges that Beatrice is hiding a secret about her mum, and ends up having a heart-to-heart with Miss Tapioca. Finally, Miss Tapioca's daughter, Mabel, joins Cackles. First appearance: Annette Hannah as Mabel Tapioca
30	4	"The Swamp Troll"	Unknown	Unknown	28 January 2019	0.232
Full of bitterness over Mildred and Julie, and feeling isolated, Ethel's use of negatively-fuelled magic turns her into a swamp troll and leads to her being banished to the forest by Miss Hardbroom. With nobody aware that the troll is actually Ethel, all her hopes lie on Sybil and whether she can perform a complicated translation potion. Meanwhile, Julie becomes more careless with her magic ability, and her latest spell backfires when it turns Mildred into a doll which leads to her having to give up her magic.
31	5	"The Owl and the Pussycat"	Unknown	Unknown	4 February 2019	0.185
Let down by her parents (again) Enid is feeling blue, but she soon finds a new purpose in trying to help Maud when Midnight starts to disappear, possibly a sign that a witch is losing her magic. While Enid summons the last of the Wise Owls to create a cure, Mildred learns that Midnight was actually losing magic because 'he' was a she who had just given birth to kittens.
32	6	"The Game"	Unknown	Paul Gerstenberger	11 February 2019	0.201
A new game craze is sweeping the academy, and everyone's hooked. But then, the girls' magic starts to disappear followed by some girls and staff themselves. Mildred and Maud try to find out who's behind it. Maud realises that Julie still has her magic and she's behind it but Mildred takes offence to this and they fall out. Meanwhile, it is Sybil's birthday but everyone has forgotten. Can Clarice and Beatrice make it up to her?
33	7	"Bad Magic"	Unknown	Unknown	18 February 2019	0.171
With half the school including Ethel, Miss Cackle, Maud and Enid gone, Julie's magic spins out of control and Mildred learns from Miss Hardbroom that she wished her non-magical friend (Indigo Moon) magical too and she got addicted and it ended with her being turned by stone into a statue so its all up to Mildred to make sure the same won't occur to her Mum. Mildred and Miss Hardbroom visit Mildred's family tree where they find out how to reverse her Mum's gradual transformation into stone. Mildred brews the potion just in time and not just her Mum, but all the missing people are saved. Miss Cackle and Miss Hardbroom make her Mum realise that she has to give up her magic, which she does, and her Mum has to leave Cackles. Miss Hardbroom refuses to use what's left of the potion to save Indigo, not wanting to break the Witches Code like she did as a child. Elsewhere, Beatrice, Sybil and Clarice wake up on the morning after Sybil's party and accidentally turn Miss Drill's cat into a cake. This starts off a chain of lies that results in Miss Drill thinking she's been fired. Eventually, Mildred's potion restores the cat and Miss Drill agrees not to punish the girls for their mistake, but she will for throwing a secret party! First Appearance: Kelsey-Calladine Smith as Indigo Moon
34	8	"The Cackle Run"	Unknown	Unknown	25 February 2019	0.100
Indigo Moon is released from her stone statue exile and is soon wreaking havoc at Cackles, meaning that Mildred's secret is out. Ethel ends up challenging Indigo to the Cackle Run, an extremely dangerous broomstick route. Indigo races after Ethel to try and save her after Ethel mistakenly thinks she is protected by a potion. Will they be okay? Elsewhere, Beatrice and Sybil are surprised when they see that Clarice has a 'bother boil', which they put down to stress about exams. They tell Clarice other people's worries so that that boil will absorb them and make everyone relax. But, afraid to share her own worries, Clarice begins to feel overwhelmed and starts to doubt whether she will pass her exams.
35	9	"Starstruck"	Unknown	Paul Gerstenberger	4 March 2019	0.149
When Indigo disappears after being humiliated by Miss Hardbroom again on her first day at Cackles, Mildred and Maud track her to a TV talent show in a nearby city and wangle their way into the studio. Meanwhile, Enid falls out with Maud and Mildred saying Indigo is wasting her time. In the end, after dropping out of the talent race, Mildred, Maud, and Indigo return to Cackle's and just in time for Narcissus's show and appear on stage in front of everyone. Enid apologizes to Maud and Mildred for what she said earlier and welcomes Indigo to their school. The four girls reconcile as everyone, sans Ethel, applauds them.
36	10	"Finding Joy"	Unknown	Unknown	11 March 2019	0.132
When Mildred masquerades as Indigo's lost friend Joy (who is now Miss Hardbroom) in a bid to cheer her up, Miss Hardbroom is soon onto them.
37	11	"The Broom Stick Uprising"	Unknown	Unknown	18 March 2019	0.110
Mildred uses a re-animation potion on an old broom to help her sweep up faster – but her thoughtless treatment of it leads to a broomstick rebellion. Mildred is taken prisoner and only released after giving all the brooms a makeover – which then return the favour and save the day for Indigo in a daring flying display after she looks set to fail her exam. Then, as Miss Hardbroom is about to tell Indigo everything, Ethel spoils it all by showing her Miss Hardbroom's file - which Mildred had hidden in her room - causing Indigo to run off, angry that Mildred and Miss Hardbroom refused to tell her. Elsewhere, a mysterious old woman turns up at Cackles, claiming to be Star's owner and has a photo to prove it. She leaves with him but Sybil and Clarice are suspicious and when they describe the woman to Miss Bat, it emerges that she is a wanted criminal who has mistreated magical animals for years. Sybil and Clarice rescue the animals, have the woman (who reveals to be another witch) arrested and return Star safely to Mildred.
38	12	"Ethel Hallow to the Rescue, Parts 1 and 2"	Unknown	Unknown	25 March 2019	0.159
39	13	"Ethel Hallow to the Rescue, Parts 1 and 2"	Unknown	Unknown	25 March 2019	0.159
With Miss Bat and Mr Rowan-Webb's Wedding approaching there is still no sign of Indigo Moon. When a wedding gift of a Wishing Star arrives Mildred and Ethel hatch a plan to steal the wish to help find Indigo. However, when Ethel is generously granted the making of the wish by Mildred, she enacts her real plan which is to summon a false Indigo with the intention of destroying the Academy - which Ethel can then thwart, thus restoring her family name... Until the false Indigo appears again and Ethel loses control of her. Only when the real Indigo turns up, will they be able to save the day. But with the real Indigo still missing, the school only have 30 minutes - hand over Miss Hardbroom who will be turned to stone as revenge for what happen to Indigo, or the false Indigo will destroy Cackles! Final appearances: Philip Martin Brown as Mr. Rowan-Webb and Wendy Craig as Miss Bat Notes: Final appearance of Bella Ramsey as Mildred Hubble. This is the final episode to air on Disney Channel when it finished airing the show on October 31, 2021.

=== Series 4 (2020) ===
No. overall	No. in series	Title	Directed by	Written by	Original release date	UK viewers (millions)
40	1	"The Three Impossibilities"	Dirk Campbell	Neil Jones	27 January 2020	0.252
When an apparently botched potions experiment leaves Mildred with a whole new look, can she complete three impossible challenges and reverse the spell before the sun goes down? It is revealed this was sabotage by Ethel Hallow, who had substituted an appearance-spell to prevent Mildred from applying for head girl. Meanwhile, Beatrice, Sybil and Clarice have become part of the junior coven and are tasked by leader Fenella to prove their loyalty by teaching first year Izzy Jones (Peppercorn in the end credits) how to ride a broom. Izzy is from a non-magical background and it's clear very quickly that she has a lot to learn and that she's afraid of heights. Not knowing this, Beatrice attempts to help Izzy by giving her a levitation spell. Izzy lifts up in the air just before a shocked Clarice realises that nobody has taught her how to control the broom! Mildred becomes stuck in her new look when she fails to complete the last impossible challenge. Instead she rescues Izzy from her broomstick after falling off it. Fenella informs Clarice, Sybil and Beatrice that they're out of the coven after their failed attempt to help Izzy. First appearances: Saoirse Addison as Izzy Jones and Billie Boullet as Fenella Feverfew Note: First appearance of Lydia Page as Mildred Hubble. However, Bella Ramsey can be seen briefly as Mildred Hubble in the scene where she almost completely turns back into her old appearance before she is forced to abandon the last impossible challenge at the last minute to save Izzy.
41	2	"Gertrude the Great"	Dirk Campbell	Julie Bower	3 February 2020	0.241
Enid's attempt to help Mildred win her first head girl challenge backfires when she summons Cackle's first-ever head girl, Gertrude the Great, or "Gertrude the Great Deceiver" as it says on her portrait, she is actually an ancestor of Ethel Hallow and misleads Mildred, giving Ethel a handful of berries to complete the familiar-auxiliar potion. Meanwhile, Enid, Indigo and Maud discover the portrait noticing juniper berries in her hand and deduce they're needed for the potion challenge. Mildred is accused of cheating (despite her golden eagle manifestation) and Ethel wins the first round of the challenge (with her fox). Elsewhere, Clarice, Sybil and Beatrice can't believe that the coven will be performing the legendary Witch Trot but Fenella refuses to let them join in. Sybil suggests making themselves invisible so they can line up with the coven in secret, and Mabel will perform the reversal so they can appear just as the performance begins. But there is a hitch and the girls remain invisible for the whole performance, causing the coven to trip and fall repeatedly during the dance. The coven is a laughing stock and Fenella is embarrassed with the girls for ruining the performance.
42	3	"Happy Birthday, Indigo Moon"	Dirk Campbell	Neil Jones	10 February 2020	0.145
It is Indigo's birthday celebrations, and she suddenly starts ageing 30 years for a few moments at time. Maud thinks Indigo's lost time as a statue is reasserting her real age. Miss Hardbroom, who was trying to adopt Indigo, discovers Indigo has a real mother and returns Indigo back in time to be with her. She wipes Indigo's memory so she has no memory of Cackles or anybody there. Later, the adult Indigo arrives with her daughter, Azura, who has come to enrol at Cackles. Miss Cackle, with help from Felicity, makes Miss Hardbroom speak to Indigo and enrol Azura. This allows Miss Hardbroom to finally let go of her past with Indigo, relieved that it has all finally worked out. In one sub-plot, Miss Hempnettle, the new games mistress is introduced and it is emerged that she has a bad history with Miss Drill, who has picked up a sporting injury. Meanwhile, first year Izzy is struggling to settle in following her broomstick experience. In an attempt to help, Clarice, Beatrice and Sybil make a potion for Izzy to make Cackles seem more like home. But it only succeeds in making Izzy feel that she is surrounded by her family members and is really at home! She ends up in trouble after winding up Miss Drill and Miss Tapioca whilst under the influence of the potion. But she is persuaded to stay after Mildred and Sybil ask her to look after Azura. First appearance: Luciana Akpobaro as Azura Moon Final appearance: Kelsey Callandine-Smith as Indigo Moon
43	4	"Enid Nightshade, Superstar"	Dirk Campbell	Claire Miller	17 February 2020	0.148
Enid's mum arrives asking her join the Deadly Nightshades. Mildred and Ethel prepare for the next head girl test, an "Express yourself" debate. Enid uses a potion to make Mildred smarter, the improvement is too obviously cheating. Enid's attempt to reverse the effect is thwarted by Ethel sending the potion away on a broom stick. Enid is convinced to stay when Miss Hempnettle says her amazing speed, in recovering the potion from the fly-away broom, is worthy of the World Witch Games. Meanwhile, Clarice makes some balloon pants for spell and tell, designed to make flying easier for nervous travellers. But she miscalculates and they end up dropping her into a pot of Miss Tapioca's stew! With help from Miss Drill, the design is improved and they end up helping Izzy and Azura with their first broom flight. Mildred wins the debate after Enid performs the reversal just in time.
44	5	"The Forbidden Tree"	Dirk Campbell	Paul Gerstenberger	24 February 2020	0.162
When Ethel commits a terrible sin (by killing the oldest tree in the forest) to beat Mildred to the Nature Star badge, she's initiates a dreadful chain of events resulting in her slowly becoming a tree herself. Felicity's knowledge as a Green Witch proves very useful and she is able to work with Mildred, Maud and Enid to help Ethel restore the balance of nature. Despite her help, Felicity says that she is still not ready for everyone to know that she is a Green Witch, worried that people will see her differently. Elsewhere, Mabel starts producing shake-drinks, and to make them sell she adds addictive powdered mandrake shoots from the kitchen, causing chaotic demands for more until Miss Drill steps in to save the day.
45	6	"Maud's Magical Make-over"	Dermot Boyd	Scott Payne	2 March 2020	0.150
Maud spurns Mildred after she is persuaded by Miss Hempnettle to invite Enid to be deputy in the head girl competition. Maud moves in with Felicity, after a bunk room bat invasion, and Maud discovers Felicity uses a secret coolness potion. Transforming herself, Maud wins new fans but causes friction. Enid discovers Miss Hempnettle cheated her potion enhanced race timings. When Enid speaks to Miss Drill about Miss Hempnettle, Miss Drill reveals that Miss Hempnettle caused her injury and resulted in her missing out on a gold medal. She advises Enid not to trust Miss Hempnettle as she is a cheat. Mabel shares a mind reading potion with her chums, and eventually uses it on her Mum, Miss Tapioca, and realises her Mum is lovingly proud of her. Maud and Felicity squabble and spill the potion, then Maud, realising her error, causes all forms of coolness to fail at a party in the forest with boys from Amulets. Now non-cool, the party goers still get on.
46	7	"The Crystal Lake"	Dermot Boyd	Neil Jones	9 March 2020	0.122
Clumsy Mr. Daisy, the new Spell Science teacher arrives at Cackles upsetting Mabel's sweet stall. Mildred is conned into visiting the "fortune telling" Crystal Lake by an evil old crone, Jessica Juniper, masquerading as a girl from Pentangles in the magic mirror. In the forest Mildred meets Clarice, Sybil and Beatrice, who were conned too. At the lake Mildred is attacked by the crone, and finally performs protection spell and is rescued by Maud and Miss Hardbroom. Feeling irresponsible she resigns as head girl contender, but, on seeing Ethel's future in Mr. Daisy's flask, she asks to rejoin, realising that if Ethel wins the head girl contest, there will be disaster for Cackles! Meanwhile, Enid is tricked by Miss Hempnettle into acquiring Miss Drill's special speed potion. First appearance: Nitin Ganatra as Mr. Daisy
47	8	"Enid's Last Race"	Dermot Boyd	Paul Gerstenberger	16 March 2020	0.151
Enid leaves Cackles Academy after being tricked into stealing Miss Drill's speed potion formula. She rehearses with her eager mother for "The Deadly Nightshades and family" show. Miss Drill does not blame Enid and (along with Mildred) persuades her to take part in the Witch World Games qualifiers. Meanwhile, Miss Tapioca, Mr Daisy, and students rustle up ingredients for Miss Drill's potion which helps Enid to win, despite sneaky tricks by Miss Hempnettle. Enid accepts a place at the prestigious Mount Broom sporting academy now with the encouragement of her mother. Miss Drill is able to finally expose Miss Hempnettle as the cheat she is and has her summoned before the Magic Council. Enid says an emotional goodbye to Mildred, Maud and the rest of Cackles as she leaves for the sporting academy. In a sub-plot Ethel undermines Azura as a school ambassador to the Magic Council. Final appearances: Tamara Smart as Enid Nightshade and Karen Paullada as Miss Hempnettle
48	9	"Mildred the Detective"	Dermot Boyd	Kirstie Falkous & Neil Jones	23 March 2020	0.124
Ethel accuses Mildred of taking her head girl badges. A locating crystal leads Ethel to find them on the roof. Many other strange events occur around the academy like the broom store, kitchen and library all in a mess. Miss Cackle assigns Mildred and Ethel the head-girl-competition task of discovering the prankster. Meanwhile, Fenella is too controlling in her dining etiquette project (plus sabotage by the prankster) results in the coven leaving her and joining an alternative meal in the kitchen set up by Mabel, Sybil, Beatrice and Clarice. Mildred sees an unattached shadow of Azura's silhouette, leading to the revelation Azura had cast a spell to rid herself of scary dark shadows: her own became detached causing the events. Azura's shadow starts to attack Fenella and Clarice manages to temporarily freeze the shadow, giving Azura enough time to remember and perform the reversal at Mildred's encouragement. Fenella apologizes to Clarice, Sybil and Beatrice for being mean to them over the coven and she becomes their friend again. Mildred volunteers to take the blame for Azura, and Miss Hardbroom says this is evidence of head girl material. Miss Hardbroom also gives Azura a cat (ironically named Shadow) so she won't be alone in the dark. Meanwhile, Mr Daisy is up to something secretive in a shed, but what?
49	10	"A Witch in Time"	Lindy Heymann	Scott Payne	30 March 2020	0.145
Mildred and Ethel compete in the Head Girl competition Triathlon, Mildred wins chanting and flying but loses on control of her familiar Tabby. Worried her vision of Ethel making all the students disappear if she becomes head girl, Mildred uses a sandtimer to go back in time four times. Her three initial attempts all end in disaster (her dog raids the kitchen after taking the confidence potion she gave Tabby, Maud loses her voice when she yells too much in the broomstick race after the order of the competition is changed, and next time injured when Izzy comes back with her and her absence distracts Mildred at a crucial moment). Fourthly, at Mr. Daisy's behest "A great witch relies on her wits, not just her magic," Mildred wins the Triathlon. Meanwhile, Mr Daisy's secret Patented Potions Machine is revealed and is sabotaged by Mabel, who eventually relents when Miss Hardbroom intends to sack him for incompetence.
50	11	"Grounded"	Lindy Heymann	Paul Gerstenberger	6 April 2020	< 0.115
The arrival of a magical comet is announced. With Mildred and Ethel getting ready for the final head girl challenge (to create a new spell) Mildred starts to suffer from magical burnout. Knowing this Maud, Izzy and Mrs Cackle decide to send her to rest at Izzy's farm to watch the comet. Upon arriving Mildred's attempts at magic go wrong to the point of her magic completely failing. After a bit of digging it is found that Mildred needs her family's grounding stone to restore her magic, and since she has no idea where it is, Izzy's dad hatch's a plan to use the comet to create a new one. Back at the school Ethel tries to disqualify Mildred from the head girl competition by snitching on a half-heard conversation between Mildred and Mr. Daisy when returning his sandtimer. Maud and Azura try to delay Ethel, this only works for a short while before Ethel brings Miss Hardbroom into it. This leads to a confrontation with Mr Daisy who ultimately protects Mildred by claiming he was the one to loop time. Miss Hardbroom announces that as a result, he will be fired at the end of term, leaving the girls devastated. Back at the farm Mildred and Izzy's attempts to create a new grounding stone ultimately fail, when all is assumed lost Mildred's true grounding stone is found as Izzy's dad (Spike Jones played by Alun Raglan) was given it by Mrs Hubble many years ago in Morocco. Mildred restores her magic and goes back to the academy with a good idea for her Spell.
51	12	"The Witching Hour: Part 1"	Lindy Heymann	Neil Jones	13 April 2020	0.163
Ethel and Mildred perform their newly designed spells in the final round of the Head Girl competition. Mildred's spell apparently goes wrong and turns Headmistress Miss Cackle into shattered glass. Mildred is sent to The Correctional School for Undesirable Witches, Wormwood, where she is befriended by Camilla Clove (played by Madeleine Edmondson) and menaced by the cruel jailer Miss Splinter (played by Sue Vincent). Meanwhile, Maud analyses playback and realises someone else caused Miss Cackle's demise and deliberately gets herself sent to Wormwood too with a plan to free Mildred. This leaves Izzy and Azura to find out who framed Mildred. It turns out that Ethel was doing Agatha (Ada's evil twin) Cackle's bidding and tricked Felicity into sabotaging Mildred's spell. Izzy and Azura discover Felicity's role in the plan, who eventually decides to confess to Miss Hardbroom but Ethel stops her by lying that she will do it. Mildred and Maud make their escape from Wormwood and realize that they have to stop Ethel from becoming Head Girl. In a sub-plot, an attempt to comfort (the soon to be dismissed) Mr Daisy with a Happiness Potion goes wrong, when he dances in an overly familiar way with an unimpressed Miss Hardbroom! Back at the academy, Ethel is forced to free Agatha after the former promises that she will be Head Girl and that Miss Cackle will be alright, even if Ethel believes that this is wrong and that Mildred should have won in the first place. But by the time she realizes this, Agatha had returned from the painting, much to Ethel's horror and guilt.
52	13	"The Witching Hour: Part 2"	Lindy Heymann	Neil Jones	20 April 2020	< 0.097
In the series finale, Agatha Cackle, impersonating headmistress Ada, promotes Ethel to head girl, and at the school assembly tricks everyone else into the Vanishment plane of existence, including Julie (who had been messaged by Maud). Agatha locks Mr. Daisy away and thwarts Miss Hardbroom with a magic restricting brooch. She also demands the Great Wizard hands over his title or she will not reveal the secret word (the name of her first familiar) that will release the girls, Miss Drill and Julie from Vanishment. Julie organises tower building with junk in the vanishment plane, and they all escape apart from Julie who cannot reach up to the vanishment hole, with only moments left when it starts to recycle. Mildred and Maud search for the magic reversal word (the name of Agatha Cackle's first familiar) to reverse the vanishment and in the process discover Mr. Daisy locked away. He agrees to use his potion machine, so while Mildred and Maud delay Agatha with distractions and Ethel grabs the remains of Miss Cackle from Agatha, his machine's potion restores Miss Cackle. She in turn saves Julie with the secret word. Agatha banishes herself whilst Vanishment is still recycling, not wanting to return to the photograph. As Mildred and Maud make their way to the end-of-term ceremony, where Mildred will be promoted to Head Girl, Miss Hardbroom tells Mildred the reason why she had been hard on her throughout her four years is because she is proud of Mildred for being herself. When they reach the assembly hall, Mildred learns that Izzy Jones is her sister and Spike is her dad, who Julie met in Morocco just before she was born. As the end-of-term ceremony gets underway, Miss Cackle announces that she is back to where she belongs. Wormwood School is closed, thanks to Mildred and Maud's rebellion from the previous episode, which they are both praised for by the other girls. Cackles Academy is back to normal, and Mildred is promoted to Head Girl or valedictorian, in recognition for saving the academy once again, which delights everyone, including Ethel, who is relieved of the outcome. Mildred accepts the position and expresses to the rest of the students, through an emotional acceptance speech, how far she has come since joining Cackles, comes to realization that magic is real as long as you believe in it, witch or not, and is grateful to her friends and family for their support. As the school cheers for Mildred and celebrates the defeat of Agatha Cackle and the end of another term, Mildred, Maud, Azura, and Izzy joyfully embrace and Ethel reconciles with Sybil and Felicity. After the credits roll, in a post-credit scene, outside the school during a party to celebrate Mildred's promotion, Ethel tells Mildred she'll do great as Head Girl, just before Mildred offers her to be her advisor, to which Ethel accepts. As Mildred leaves to join the celebration, the series ends with Ethel smiling in relief knowing that Mildred is not bad after all. Note: The original broadcast of the episode on CBBC ends with a thank-you tribute from the cast.
