= List of The Worst Witch episodes =

List of The Worst Witch episodes may refer to one of the following:

- List of The Worst Witch (1998 TV series) episodes
- List of The Worst Witch (2017 TV series) episodes
