= Nitin Ganatra =

British actor (born 1967)

Nitin Ganatra OBE
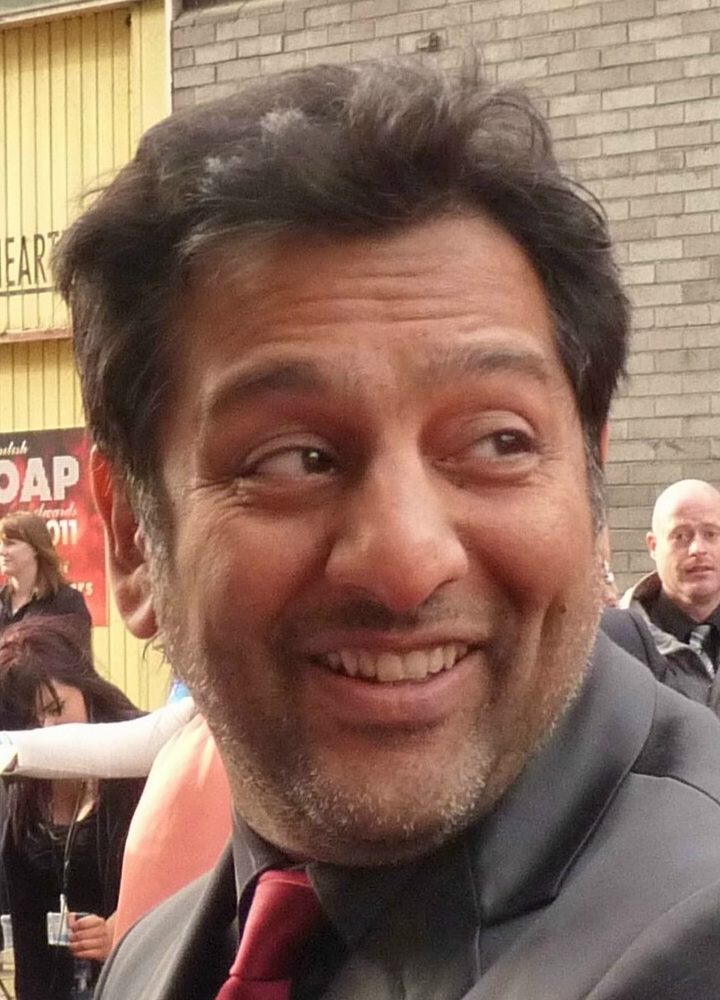
- Ganatra at the 2011 British Soap Awards
- Born: 21 February 1967 (age 59); Kenya
- Occupation: Actor
- Television: EastEnders; Mumbai Calling; The Worst Witch; Wednesday
- Spouse: Meera Ganatra (m. 2004)
- Children: 2

Nitin Chandra Ganatra (born 21 February 1967) is a British actor. He is known for portraying Masood Ahmed in the BBC soap opera EastEnders (2007–2019), for which he won a British Soap Award.

== Early life ==
Ganatra was born on 30 June 1967 in Kenya. Both sides of his family have origins in Gujarat, India, which was explored on-screen in the 2013 series of Who Do You Think You Are? Ganatra's great-grandfather arrived in Kenya in the late 1890s, as one of 32,000 contracted labourers to build the Uganda Railway. One of under 10,000 to stay in the country after the railway's completion, his grandfather and father later joined the family's general trading business.

After Kenya gained independence from the United Kingdom and forced the native Indian population to choose between Kenya and their British passports in 1971, Ganatra, aged 3, moved with his family to Coventry, where the family still owned a corner shop.

Ganatra was educated at Coundon Court School and Community College on Northbrook Road and then studied Drama, Film, and Television at the University of Bristol. He went on to train under the tutelage of the late Master theatre practitioner Jerzy Grotowski.

== Career ==
Ganatra is known internationally as Prince Pondicherry in the Tim Burton film Charlie and the Chocolate Factory. He also appears in the Gurinder Chada film Bride and Prejudice as Kholi Saab and The Mistress of Spices as Haroun, and Dev Raja in Mumbai Calling. Ganatra also appeared in the first ever iPod commercial and in an episode of The Catherine Tate Show, as Joanie Taylor's daughter's partner.

Other appearances include the television show Jane Hall, the Patents Clerk in Philip Pullman's The Shadow in the North, the CBBC television show Gina's Laughing Gear, a character in Meet the Magoons portraying himself, a semi lead role as Rez, brother of main character Shifty, in the 2008 British cult film Shifty about a Muslim crack-cocaine dealer, and Martin Soper in Twenty Twelve. Ganatra also appeared in Being April, portraying the role of Sinil.

On 15 October 2014, Ganatra appeared in an episode of Celebrity Squares. On 25 March 2015, he was featured in a comedy interview alongside comedian Paul Chowdhry in which he pretended to lose his temper and "attacked" Chowdhry. Ganatra's appearance on Pointless Celebrities, where he had to have the rules explained to him by the host, was included in a 2020 special called Pointless: The Good, the Bad and the Bloopers.

It was announced in May 2017 that Ganatra would appear in comedy feature Eaten by Lions, alongside Antonio Aakeel and Jack Carroll. He also appeared in the Channel 4 drama The State, portraying the father of a young British Muslim who went to join ISIS. In 2020, Ganatra portrayed spell science teacher Mr. Daisy in the CBBC series The Worst Witch, and a lawyer in a two-part episode of Trial & Retribution.

In 2022, Ganatra also appeared in episode four of season one of the Netflix series Wednesday, directed by Tim Burton, as Dr. Anwar. In February 2023, Ganatra portrayed Kamil Razaq in an episode of the BBC soap opera Doctors.

=== EastEnders ===
On 16 October 2007, Ganatra began playing regular character Masood Ahmed in the BBC One soap opera, EastEnders. He also appeared in the 2010 spin-off series EastEnders: E20. Ganatra left EastEnders in 2016. Ganatra made a one-off appearance on 28 November 2017 and returned permanently on 1 January 2018. On 26 January 2019, it was announced Ganatra had decided to leave his role as Masood, and he left the show later that year.

At The British Soap Awards, Ganatra won Best On-Screen Partnership with Nina Wadia in 2009, and was nominated for Best Actor the following year.

== Personal life ==
On 17 July 2004, Ganatra and Meera Thakrar were married. They have two children and live in North London.

In April 2019, Ganatra was honoured with the Outstanding Achievement in Television award at The Asian Awards.

Ganatra was appointed Officer of the Order of the British Empire (OBE) in the 2022 New Year Honours for services to drama.

== Filmography ==
=== Film ===
Year	Film	Character	Notes
1990	Truly, Madly, Deeply	Ghost	
1996	Secrets & Lies	Potential Husband	
1998	Guru in Seven	Sanjay	
2000	This Bastard Business	Raj	Short
2001	The Love Doctor	Vivek	Short
2002	Shooters	Ajay	
2002	Another Day	Sunil	Short
2002	Stag	Sammi	Short
2002	Pure	Abu	
2002	Inferno	Naz	Short
2004	Chess: A Game Plan		
2004	Bride and Prejudice	Kohli Saab	
2004	Piccadilly Jim	Banje Singh	
2005	Charlie and the Chocolate Factory	Prince Pondicherry	
2005	The Mistress of Spices	Haroun	
2005	Colour Me Kubrick	Deepak	
2006	Land of the Blind	Prison Official	
2007	The Hunting Party	Indian Officer	
2008	Shifty	Rez	
2009	Mad, Sad & Bad	Atul	
2017	Disconnect	Abdullah	Short
2018	Eaten by Lions	Malik	
2019	Hellboy	August Swain	
2021	Expiation	Jimmy	Short
2023	Short Stay, Long Stay	Vinny	Short
2023	Accused	Ramesh Bhavsar	
2024	Seize Them!	Witgar the Baker	
2024	The Collaborator	The Boy's Father / Sarpanch	
2024	Elephant		Short
2025	Christmas Karma	Parduman Singh (Shopkeeper)	
2026	Frank and Percy †		Post-production

=== Television ===
Year	Film	Character	Notes
1996	Thief Takers	Doctor	Episode: "No One Likes to See That"
1997	This Life	Salim	Episode: "Room With a Queue"
1999	Our Charly	Ravi Patel	Episode: "Charly und der Affengott"
1999	Extremely Dangerous	Ali Khan	
1999; 2006	The Bill	Mr. Chauduri; Charlie May	Episode: "Makeover"; Episode: "Honour Amongst Thieves"
2000	The Sins	Job Centre Clerk	
2001	Murder in Mind	Riaz Chowdry	Episode: "Sleeper"
2001	Sweet Revenge	Lawyer	
2001	Randall & Hopkirk (Deceased)	Ramon	Episode: "Painkillers"
2001	Kumbh Mela: The Greatest Show on Earth	Narrator	Documentary
2002	The Jury	Tariq Shah	4 episodes
2002	Rescue Me	Jimmy	
2002	Being April	Sunil	
2002	Mr & Mrs Jones	Adam Crawley	Television film
2002	Comedy Lab	Nitin	Episode: "Meet the Magoons"
2002; 2018	Silent Witness	DI Roy Pereira; Simon Laing	Episodes: "Kith and Kill: Part 1 and 2"; Episodes: "Duty of Candour: Part 1 and 2"
2003	Grease Monkeys	Doctor	Episode: "Heart of the Matter"
2003	Second Generation	Firoz Khan	Television film
2003	Canterbury Tales	Pushpinder	Episode: "The Sea Captain's Tale"
2003	Indian Dream	Dr. Rajiv Reddy	Television film
2003	You're Breaking Up	Deep	Television film
2003–2004	Holby City	Sami Sattar	Series 5–6, 9 episodes
2004	England Expects	Anwar	Television film
2005	Twisted Tales	Harry Nagra	Episode: "Murder Me"
2005	Meet the Magoons	Nitin	
2006	New Street Law	Robson	Episode: "High Risk, High Profit"
2006	Jane Hall	Sid Gokahani	
2006	Son of the Dragon	Prince of India	
2006	The Papdits	Gopi Papdit	Television film
2006	The Secret Policeman's Ball: The Ball in the Hall	Himself	Television special
2007	The Afternoon Play	Samir	Episode: "The Real Deal"
2007	Gina's Laughing Gear	Ches Nut	Episode: "Astronuts"
2007	The Grey Man	Gary Page	Television film
2007	New Tricks	Doctor Lau	Episode: "Nine Lives"
2007	The Shadow in the North	Patents Clerk	Television film
2007	The Catherine Tate Show	Ranjit	2007 Christmas special
2007	Children in Need 2007	Performer	Segment: "Beatles Tribute"
2007–2019	EastEnders	Masood Ahmed	Regular role; 763 episodes
2007–2008	Mumbai Calling	Dev Raja	Also writer
2008	Trial & Retribution	Jaheed Jeffers	Episodes: "The Box: Part 1 and 2"
2009–2011	The Wright Stuff	Himself / Panellist	9 episodes
2010	Hounded	Dr. Wu	Episode: "Look at the Stars"
2010	East Street	Masood Ahmed	Charity crossover between Coronation Street and EastEnders
2010	EastEnders: E20	Masood Ahmed	EastEnders web spin-off series; 3 episodes
2011	Twenty Twelve	Martin Soper	Episode: "Roman Remains"
2011	Children in Need 2011	Roger Taylor / Suzie Birchall	Segment: "Queen Tribute"
2012	Children in Need 2012	Masood Ahmed	Segment: "The Walford Apprentice"
2012	The Cow That Almost Missed Christmas	Dad / Ram / Camel	Voice role
2013	Tamwar Tales – The Life of an Assistant Market Inspector	Masood Ahmed	EastEnders web spin-off series
2013	Children in Need 2013	Street Dancer	Segment: "The Big Albert Square Dance"
2013	Who Do You Think You Are?	Himself	Series 10, episode 7
2014	Warren United	Dillip	Voice role
2014	Children in Need 2014	T-Bird	Segment: "GreaseEnders"
2015	EastEnders: Back to Ours	Himself	Episode: "Nitin Ganatra & Himesh Patel"
2017	The State	Munir Hossein	2 episodes
2017	Debatable	Himself / Panellist	3 episodes
2018	Children in Need 2018	Le Fou	Segment: "Once Upon a Time in Albert Square"
2019	Midsomer Murders	Ned Skye	Episode: "With Baited Breath"
2020	The Worst Witch	Mr Daisy	Series 4, 7 episodes
2021	Murder, They Hope	Carl	Episode: "The Bunny Trap"
2021	McDonald & Dodds	Dan	Episode: "The War of Rose"
2022	The Essex Serpent	Charles Ambrose	3 episodes
2022	The Undeclared War	Ahmed Parvin	2 episodes
2022	Galwad 2052	Namit	Television film
2022	Wednesday	Dr. Reggie Anwar	Episode: "Woe What a Night"
2023	Doctors	Kamil Razaq	Episode: "Hearts and Minds"
2023	Breeders	Sunil	Episodes: "No Alternative", "No Control" and "No Matter What: Part 2"
2023	Bodies	Ishmael	5 episodes
2023–2024	Changing Ends	Mr. Robertson	4 episodes
2024	Sexy Beast	Ricky Sidhu	5 episodes
2024	3 Body Problem	Ranjit Varma	Episode: "Destroyer of Worlds"
2024	Mr. Bigstuff	Brian	3 episodes
2024	Sweetpea	Rory	
2024	The Chelsea Detective	Virat Sharma	Episode: "Everybody Loves Chloe"
2025	Miss Scarlet	Amil Kapoor	Episode: "The Enchanted Mirror"
2026	The Good Ship Murder	Dominic Raja	Guest role; episode: "Valletta"
