= Lydia Page =

English actress (born 2002)

- Born: Lydia Charlotte Page; 29 May 2002 (age 24); Leicester, England
- Occupation: Actress
- Years active: 2020–present

Lydia Charlotte Page (born 29 May 2002) is an English actress. She is known for her role as the titular Mildred Hubble in the television series The Worst Witch (2020), as Primrose Larkin in the series The Larkins (2021–2022), and for playing Siobhan Murphy in the film Blue Jean (2022), for which she was nominated with the main cast for Best Ensemble Performance at the 2022 British Independent Film Awards.

== Early life ==
Page was born in Leicester, England on 29 May 2002. She trained at the Nottingham-based Television Workshop, a regional youth acting programme.

== Career ==
Page made her professional debut in 2020 when she was cast as the lead character Mildred Hubble in the fourth series of the CBBC fantasy drama The Worst Witch. She took over the role from Bella Ramsey, who had played Mildred Hubble in the first three series before leaving the show.

Later that year, Page appeared as Caitlin Demby in a single episode of the long-running BBC medical drama Casualty. From 2021 to 2022 she portrayed Primrose Larkin in the ITV television adaptation The Larkins, based on the H. E. Bates novel The Darling Buds of May.

Page secured her first film role as the bully Siobhan Murphy in the British drama Blue Jean (2022), written and directed by Georgia Oakley. The film depicts a closeted teacher's struggles to keep her sexuality hidden after the arrival of a new student. The film received positive reviews. Tim Robey of The Telegraph wrote that Page was "terrific" as Murphy, and praised her comedic performance. Page was nominated with the cast for Best Ensemble Performance at the 2022 British Independent Film Awards.

In 2022 she appeared as Pru in the television adaptation The Confessions of Frannie Langton. She later acted in the short film Rapture (2023), and in the horror film Home Education (2023). She is set to appear in the second series of BBC One's Nightsleeper as Lola, which is currently being filmed in Belfast.

== Filmography ==
=== Film ===
Year	Title	Role	Notes	Ref.
2022	Blue Jean	Siobhan Murphy	Feature film	
2023	Home Education	Rachel	Feature film	
2023	Rapture	Orla	Short film	

=== Television ===
Year	Title	Role	Notes	Ref.
2020	The Worst Witch	Mildred Hubble	Main role; series 4	
2020	Casualty	Caitlin Demby	1 episode	
2021–2022	The Larkins	Primrose Larkin	Main role	
2022	The Confessions of Frannie Langton	Pru	Recurring role	
TBA	Nightsleeper	Lola	TBA	

=== Awards and nominations ===
Year	Award	Category	Nominated work	Result	Ref.
2022	British Independent Film Awards	Best Ensemble Performance	Blue Jean	Nominated	
