= Home Education (film) =

2023 English-language Italian horror film

- Theatrical release poster
- Directed by: Andrea Niada
- Written by: Andrea Niada
- Produced by: Benedetto Habib; Chiara Cardoso; Daniel Campos Pavoncelli; Fabrizio Donvito; Giuliano Papadia; Marco Cohen
- Starring: Julia Ormond; Lydia Page; Rocco Fasano
- Cinematography: Stefano Falivene
- Edited by: Matteo Bini
- Music by: Andrea Boccadoro
- Production companies: Warner Bros. Entertainment Italia; Indiana Production; BlackBox
- Distributed by: Warner Bros. Pictures
- Release date: 30 November 2023
- Running time: 90 minutes
- Country: Italy
- Language: English
- Box office: $468,751

Home Edcucation (Italian: Home Education - Le regole del male) is a 2023 English-language Italian horror film written and directed by Andrea Niada. The film stars Julia Ormond and Lydia Page in the lead roles.

The film was released in Italy on 30 November 2023 by Warner Bros. Pictures.

== Cast ==
- Lydia Page as Rachel
- Julia Ormond as Carol
- Rocco Fasano as Dan
- Richard Ginn as Philip
- Alessandra Silipo as Carlotta
