= Thin Ice (2000 film) =

- Cast (L-R): Stephen Taylor, Raquel Cassidy, Nicholas Lyndhurst, Tim Dantay and Geraldine McEwan
- Genre: Thriller
- Written by: Tom Needham
- Directed by: Ian White
- Starring: Nicholas Lyndhurst; Geraldine McEwan; Tim Dantay; Raquel Cassidy; Sian Webber; Stephen Taylor; Terry Bird; Peter McNamara
- Composer: Max de Wardener
- Country of origin: United Kingdom
- Original language: English
- No. of episodes: 1

Production
- Executive producers: Mike Dormer; Mal Young
- Producer: Ann Tricklebank
- Cinematography: Peter Butler
- Editor: P.R. Brown
- Running time: 75 minutes
- Production company: BBC Worldwide

Original release
- Network: BBC1
- Release: 4 December 2000

Thin Ice is a single British television thriller, written by Tom Needham and directed by Ian White, that first broadcast on BBC1 on 4 December 2000. Thin Ice focuses on the character of Dr. Graham Moss (Nicholas Lyndhurst), a shady General Practitioner using his services as a practising doctor to issue fake sick notes and excess medication, who gets pulled into taking part in a bank robbery by one of his patients, gangland boss Violet Jerome (Geraldine McEwan).

The film was commissioned as one of eleven new dramas unveiled by the BBC for their Autumn/Winter season in 2000. Considered as a potential pilot for an ongoing series, the character of Moss was likened to Harold Shipman, with Guardian writer Mark Lawson describing him as "the greatest Charlatan since Crippin." The film attracted an audience of 5.68 million viewers.

== Reception ==
Mark Lawson of The Guardian gave the film a mixed review, writing; "There is much to enjoy in Thin Ice. The morbid jokes, such as a dead man's mobile ringing as Moss begins the autopsy, serves as an eerie reminder of the Paddington rail disaster. There is another level, however, at which Thin Ice is pure rubbish. The increasingly ludicrous plot unwinds like a strange morphine dream. Thin Ice never quite knows whether it is an absurd romp or a darker meditation on the psychosis of a corrupt doctor. What is not in dispute is that it is well-timed."

== Cast ==
- Nicholas Lyndhurst as Dr. Graham Moss
- Geraldine McEwan as Mrs. Violet Jerome
- Tim Dantay as DI Grover
- Raquel Cassidy as DS Beckett
- Sian Webber as Della Jerome
- Stephen Taylor as Harvey Jerome
- Terry Bird as Neal Jerome
- Peter McNamara as Frank Jerome
- Dennis Banks as Jacko
- Inday Ba as Joo
- Philip Madoc as Headmaster
- Darren Tunstall as Robert Cutting
- Luke Newberry as Charlie
- Jonjo O'Neill as Erik
