= The Worst Witch (2017 TV series) =

Fantasy drama children's television series

- Genre: Fantasy; Drama
- Based on: The Worst Witch by Jill Murphy
- Developed by: Emma Reeves
- Directed by: Brian Grant
- Starring: Clare Higgins; Raquel Cassidy; Bella Ramsey; Meibh Campbell; Tallulah Milligan; Jenny Richardson; Dagny Rollins; Miriam Petche; Kacey Ainsworth; Wendy Craig; Shauna Shim; Nicola Stephenson; Tamara Smart; Philip Martin Brown; Nicholas Jones; Amanda Holden; Megan Hughes; Trixie Hyde; Kitty Slack; Ynez Williams; Mina Anwar; Zita Sattar; Annette Hannah; Kelsey Calladine-Smith; Lydia Page; Saoirse Addison; Billie Boullet; Luciana Akpobaro; Karen Paullada; Nitin Ganatra
- Composer: Mark Russell
- Countries of origin: United Kingdom; Germany
- Original language: English
- No. of series: 4
- No. of episodes: 52 (list of episodes)

Production
- Executive producers: Marcus Wilson (season 1); Arne Lohmann; Nicole Keeb; Tamara Rothenberg (seasons 1–2); Lucy Martin (seasons 2–3); Ed Horaz (season 3); Sue Nott (season 4)
- Producers: Lucy Martin (season 1); Kim Crowthier (seasons 2–4)
- Production locations: United Kingdom; Germany
- Editors: David Mercer; David Head
- Running time: 30 minutes
- Production companies: CBBC Productions; ZDF

Original release
- Network: CBBC (United Kingdom); ZDF (Germany); Netflix (International)
- Release: 11 January 2017 – 20 April 2020

Related
- The Worst Witch (1986); The Worst Witch (1998–2001); Weirdsister College (2001); The New Worst Witch (2005–2007)

The Worst Witch is a fantasy drama children's television series that aired on CBBC and ZDF from 11 January 2017 to 20 April 2020, with each series being later available to stream on Netflix. Based on the book series of the same name by Jill Murphy, the series follows Mildred Hubble (Bella Ramsey, season one to three, and Lydia Page, season four) and her friends Maud Spellbody (Meibh Campbell and Megan Hughes) and Enid Nightshade (Tamara Smart), and rivals Ethel Hallow (Jenny Richardson), Drusilla Paddock (Tallulah Milligan) on their adventures and education at Cackle's Academy under caring headmistress Miss Cackle (Clare Higgins) and strict deputy headmistress Miss Hardbroom (Raquel Cassidy).

The series was made available to stream internationally on Netflix on 22 July 2017. It was available to members in the United Kingdom, Ireland and Germany after its premiere on CBBC and ZDF. The series premiered on CBBC on 11 January 2017. A second series began airing from 8 January 2018. The second series premiered on Netflix Australia on 27 July 2018. The third series began airing on 7 January 2019. The fourth series began airing on 27 January 2020. Netflix released the fourth series on 1 October 2020.

== Synopsis ==
=== Series 1 ===
Mildred Hubble learns about magic and witching, discovering she is a witch despite coming from a non-witching family. With the help of her new friend Maud Spellbody, Mildred goes to an academy for witches and is admitted after she saves it from the headmistress Miss Cackle's evil sister Agatha whose magic is later taken away. Mildred struggles with tasks and work, not knowing about witching her whole life, unlike her classmates. She forms friendships with new girl Enid Nightshade but becomes Ethel Hallow's rival. Later, Mildred gets expelled for leaving the grounds without permission. Agatha comes to Cackle's, tricks Esmeralda, Ethel's older sister, into giving Agatha her magic and takes over as headmistress. Learning Agatha has become headmistress from her rival, Mildred returns to Cackle's, hoping to save it. After Agatha annihilates the school due to no one liking her, Mildred and her classmates perform a spell which reverses all of Agatha's destruction. Mildred is brought back to Cackle's and finishes her first year.

=== Series 2 ===
Mildred returns to Cackle's, a much better witch than she was before. The founding stone, a stone given to witching academies to fuel magic, is found. Ethel receives a visit from Esmeralda, and she tries to convince Esmeralda to take the founding stone's magic, which Esmeralda refuses. However, to save Sybil, Ethel's and Esmeralda's younger sister, Esmeralda is forced to take the founding stone's magic, causing magic to go wrong and the castle to start freezing. While Mildred, Maud, Enid, and the Hallow sisters search for a way to re-ignite the founding stone, Mildred stumbles upon her ancestor on her family tree and learns the Hubbles are a witching family but Mirabelle, her ancestor, sacrificed her and twelve generations of magic to re-ignite the founding stone. After everybody starts freezing and the academy is evacuated, Mildred realises if she wants to save the academy, she must do what Mirabelle did. Mildred starts the spell but half-way through, Miss Mould, the art teacher, takes her place and sacrifices her magic.

=== Series 3 ===
Miss Cackle invites Mildred's mum Julie to teach art at Cackle's; however, Julie is treated horribly by Miss Hardbroom, the potions teacher, causing Mildred to steal a wishing star and make her mum magical. At first, Julie is horrified but she eventually starts to like it. However, things get suspicious and Julie gives up her magic. Later, Mildred learns Julie still has her magic and has become malevolent, turning people into clay figures. Miss Hardbroom tells Mildred she made her friend Indigo Moon magical but Indigo also became malevolent and turned to stone for thirty years. Mildred makes a potion to prevent her mum turning to stone and, in the process, turns those who turned into clay figures and Indigo Moon back to people. Julie leaves Cackle's but Indigo crashes into Mildred's room. To stay at Cackle's, Indigo needs to pass her Witch Proficiency Exam which she does but them learns Miss Hardbroom is her old friend and leaves Cackle's. Ethel, however, steals a wishing star and wishes to save the school but results in the school being damaged by a fake Indigo Moon. To stop the fake Indigo, Miss Hardbroom apologises to the real Indigo and they return to Cackle's, proving the fake Indigo is not real.

=== Series 4 ===
Ethel casts an appearance spell on Mildred to prevent her from running for head girl but Mildred runs and is given a series of tasks to beat Ethel. Mildred withdraws from the competition but finds water that can tell the future and sees Ethel as head girl in front of empty chairs. Horrified, Mildred re-enters the head girl contest in attempt to save the school. During the spell challenge, Ethel's deputy Felicity Foxglove makes Mildred's potion backfire, causing Miss Cackle to turn to glass and Mildred to be sent to Wormwood Academy for Undesirable Witches. Ethel frees Agatha from a photograph Miss Cackle trapped her in and Maud learns Mildred was framed. To save Mildred, Maud gets herself sent to Wormwood and helps her escape. However, Mildred's vision comes true and all the students are sent into vanishment after Agatha changes the Witches' Promise. To take the students out of vanishment, the name of Agatha's first familiar must be said. Spell science teacher Mr Daisy makes a potion which turns Miss Cackle back to herself who says the name, taking everyone out of vanishment. After learning she must return to the photograph, Agatha sends herself into vanishment. In recognition of saving the academy once more, Mildred is promoted to Head Girl and Maud is promoted to Deputy Head Girl in a promotion ceremony on the last day of term and Ethel reconciles with Sybil and Felicity. The series ends with Ethel reconciling with Mildred after apologizing to her for causing trouble and becomes Mildred's adviser.

== Main cast ==
Main cast of series 1 from left to right: Dagny Rollins as Felicity Foxglove, Jenny Richardson as Ethel Hallow, Tallulah Milligan as Drusilla Paddock, Tamara Smart as Enid Nightshade, Bella Ramsey as Mildred Hubble, Meibh Campbell as Maud Spellbody, Raquel Cassidy as Miss Hardbroom, Clare Higgins as Miss Cackle.

Cast list of The Worst Witch
Character	Actress/Actor	Series			
Character	Actress/Actor	1	2	3	4
Miss Ada Cackle	Clare Higgins (Note: Clare Gower and Sarah Gower portray the younger versions of Ada and Agatha Cackle in series 1, respectively.)	Main	Main	Main	Main
Agatha Cackle	Clare Higgins	Main			Main
Miss Joy Hecate Hardbroom	Raquel Cassidy (Note: Amelia Baldock portrays the younger version of Miss Hardbroom in series 3 and 4.)	Main	Main	Main	Main
Mildred Hubble	Bella Ramsey (Note: Rachel Bell portrays the older version of Mildred in series 1.)	Main	Main	Main	Guest
Mildred Hubble	Lydia Page				Main
Maud Spellbody (Note: Meibh Campbell also portrays Mona Spellbody in series 1.)	Meibh Campbell	Main			
Maud Spellbody	Megan Hughes		Main	Main	Main
Drusilla Paddock	Tallulah Milligan	Main			
Ethel Hallow (Note: Jenny Richardson also portrays Beryl Hallow in series 1.)	Jenny Richardson	Main	Main	Main	Main
Felicity Foxglove (Note: Dagny Rollins also portrays Felicia Foxglove in series 1.)	Dagny Rollins	Main	Main	Main	Main
Esmerelda Hallow	Miriam Petche	Main	Main		
Miss Geraldine Gullett	Kacey Ainsworth	Main			
Miss Gwendolyn Bat	Wendy Craig	Main	Main	Main	
Miss Dimity Drill (Note: Shauna Shim also portrays Miss Drill's older relative in series 1.)	Shauna Shim	Main	Main	Main	Main
Julie Hubble	Nicola Stephenson	Main (Note: In the seventh and eighth episodes of series 1, Nicola Stephenson is not credited in the opening sequence despite making an appearance. Instead, Nicholas Jones is credited in her place despite not appearing in those episodes.)	Main	Main	Main
Enid Nightshade	Tamara Smart	Main	Main	Main	Main
Mr Algernon Rowan-Webb	Philip Martin Brown	Main	Main	Main	
The Great Wizard	Nicholas Jones	Main (Note: In the third series, Jones only appears in the first episode despite being credited as a main cast member.)	Main	Main	
Miss Pippa Pentangle	Amanda Holden	Main (Note: In series 1, Holden only appears in episode 10 and in series 2, she only appears in episode 10 despite being credited as a main cast member.)	Main		
Sybil Hallow	Trixie Hyde		Main	Main	Main
Clarice Twigg	Kitty Slack		Main	Main	Main
Beatrice Bunch	Ynez Williams		Main	Main	Main
Miss Marigold Mould	Mina Anwar		Main		
Mrs Maria Tapioca	Zita Sattar	Recurring	Recurring	Main	Main
Mabel Tapioca	Annette Hannah			Main	Main
Indigo Moon	Kelsey Calladine-Smith (Note: Renée Castle portrays the older version of Indigo in series 4.)			Main	Main
Isabella "Izzy" Jones (Note: In series 4 episodes 1–5 and 10 CBBC's rolling end titles displayed Izzy Jones' surname incorrectly as Izzy Peppercorn.)	Saoirse Addison				Main
Fenella Feverfew	Billie Boullet				Main
Azura Moon	Luciana Akpobaro				Main
Miss Arabella Hempnettle	Karen Paullada				Main
Mr Daisy	Nitin Ganatra				Main

== Episodes ==
Series	Episodes	Originally released	
Series	Episodes	First released	Last released
1	13	11 January 2017	29 March 2017
2	13	8 January 2018	26 March 2018
3	13	7 January 2019	25 March 2019
4	13	27 January 2020	20 April 2020

== Production ==
=== Development and casting ===
In 2014, a new series of The Worst Witch was in development with the BBC. Jill Murphy, the author of the book series, said the series should be "wonderful". The cast of the show was announced in October 2016. Bella Ramsey, who had starred in Game of Thrones, was cast as Mildred. Ramsey drew similarities with Mildred. Ramsey left before the fourth season for mental and physical health reasons. Meibh Campbell played the role of Maud Spellbody for series 1, but was replaced by Megan Hughes from series 2. Of her casting, Hughes said working on the show is "great and I [Hughes] love the experience" and that she is "so grateful for the opportunity". Hughes had two auditions before being offered the part of Maud. Tamara Smart gained the part of Enid Nightshade after four months of auditioning, which she described as "very long" yet "nerve racking but at the same time very exciting". Smart was excited about the "amazing experience" when she got the part. Jenny Richardson and Miriam Petche were cast as sisters Ethel and Esmerelda Hallow. Tallulah Milligan, the daughter of Coronation Street and Waterloo Road actress Angela Griffin, was cast as Drusilla Paddock. Griffin said Milligan "absolutely loved" working on the show.

=== Filming ===
The Worst Witch was filmed at Peckforton Castle, Peckforton Cheshire, England and Burg Hohenzollern, Swabian Alps, Germany. The second series is also filmed at Adlington Hall, Adlington, Cheshire, using their grand hall, minstrel's gallery and their countryside and woods backdrop. Bella Ramsey described filming as being "really good" but said there were some challenging elements and described learning the stunts as "hard". Megan Hughes' mother, Claire, stated that Hughes had an "amazing time" and was "really happy, really positive" throughout filming.

== Reception ==
=== Critical response ===
On Rotten Tomatoes, the first series has a rating of 100% based on five critic reviews, with an average rating of 8/10. Decider called the show "sweet, fun, and a little bit goofy". Common Sense Media favourably compared it to Harry Potter though it was "quirkier" and "less scary". Mary Kassel of Screen Rant have said Ramsey "brings their characteristic humor and heart" to Mildred's character.

=== Accolades ===
Year	Award	Category	Recipient(s)/Nominee(s)	Result	Ref.
2017	British Screenwriters' Awards	Best British Children's Television	Emma Reeves	Won	
2018	British Academy Children's Awards	Young Performer	Bella Ramsey	Nominated	
2018	British Academy Children's Awards	Drama	Delyth Thomas, Neil Jones, Kim Crowther	Nominated	
2019	British Academy Children's Awards	Young Performer	Bella Ramsey	Won	
2019	British Academy Children's Awards	Drama	Kim Crowther, Dirk Campbell, Neil Jones	Nominated	
2019	British Academy Children's Awards	Performer	Raquel Cassidy	Nominated	
2019	British Academy Children's Awards	Director	Dirk Campbell	Won	
2020	Writers' Guild Awards	Best Children's TV Episode	Neil Jones for "Bad Magic"	Nominated	
