= List of The Worst Witch characters =

The Worst Witch is a series of children's books written and illustrated by Jill Murphy. The books have been adapted into a film and two television series.

== Mildred Hubble ==
Mildred Hubble is the title character of the series. Unlike the other girls at Miss Cackle's Academy for Witches, she does not come from a family of witches. She is best friends with Maud Spellbody and Enid Nightshade.

In The Worst Witch, despite accidentally ruining a broomstick display due to a sabotaged broomstick, she saves the academy from Miss Cackle's evil twin sister Agatha, who tries to turn everyone into frogs. Mildred turns Agatha and the rest of her coven into snails. Miss Cackle trusts her to look after new girl Enid Nightshade in The Worst Witch Strikes Again, to the chagrin of Maud and Miss Hardbroom. In A Bad Spell for the Worst Witch, Mildred is turned into a frog by Ethel Hallow. She discovers frog-magician Algernon Rowan-Webb, and has him changed back into a human. Mildred brings Tabby, her bumbling tabby cat, to Grim Cove with her in The Worst Witch All at Sea instead of her new black cat Ebony. In The Worst Witch Saves the Day, she again saves the academy from the ruthless Agatha Cackle (who sneaked into the school disguised as new teacher Miss Granite with a high-pitched, squeaky voice, a large cloud of orange curls, and a bizarre personality who tried to turn the academy into snails).

Mildred's project is stolen by Ethel Hallow, who bans her from art lessons with Miss Mould after Ethel turns her clay pot into five rattlesnakes in The Worst Witch to the Rescue. She rescues her talking pet tortoise from a tall pine tree after Drusilla Paddock hid him there under Ethel's orders. Mildred is given permission to keep the tortoise when he returns to normal.

In The Worst Witch and the Wishing Star, Mildred is promoted to Lantern Monitor of the school as she begins her fourth year. When she makes an idle wish on a shooting star, she gains an unexpected new pet: Star, a dog who does tricks on the broomstick. Although there is some objection to Star's presence, Mildred receives special permission for Star to be her broomstick companion (instead of Tabby) after he and Mildred help the school win a competition to earn money for a new swimming pool.

Clumsy and bumbling, Mildred is well-meaning despite her near-expulsion in The Worst Witch Strikes Again. Although she has trouble training Tabby (who is grey with black stripes instead of the required black, since they "ran out of black ones" when handing out cats), Mildred is fond of him. She enjoys cuddling up to him in bed, risks expulsion to bring him on holiday after being forced to give him up in The Worst Witch All at Sea, and is upset when it is suggested that Star replace him as her broomstick companion until Miss Cackle says that they intend Tabby to remain her general pet. Mildred has three bats in her room (Winky, Blinky, and Nod); by the fourth book in the series, the number of her bats has grown to eight.

Mildred is tall and thin, with waist-length black hair which she wears in two messy pigtails. In The Worst Witch Saves the Day, she has what Miss Hardbroom calls "a bad hair day" after borrowing Maud's styling brush and getting her hair tangled in it. Ethel chops off the styling brush, and cuts off all of Mildred's hair to hide it. In a false attempt at kindness, Ethel gives Mildred a hair-growth potion which makes her hair grow so quickly that it nearly engulfs the school.

She is played by Fairuza Balk in the 1986 film, and by Georgina Sherrington in the original 1998 TV series. In the 2017 remake, Mildred is played by Bella Ramsey; in the episode "The Best Teacher", she is played by Rachel Bell when she is temporarily aged into an older woman by what was meant as a wisdom spell) and by Lydia Page in season four after Ramsey left the series. In both TV series, Mildred is the "worst witch" because she is the first student at Cackle's with a non-magical background. She receives a scholarship for creative writing in the 1998 version, and learns about Cackle's and magic because she helps Maud get to the school on her first day after Maud crashed into her balcony in the 2017 version. In the season-two finale of the 2017 series, Mildred's ancestors are magical; thirteen generations ago, her great-grandmother sacrificed twelve generations of magic to reignite a founding stone. She becomes a redhead with blue eyes in season four after Ethel substitutes an appearance spell during her potion experiment to prevent Mildred from applying for head girl. Mildred tries to complete three challenges and reverse the spell before sunset, but is stuck in her new look when she fails to complete the last challenge. She becomes powerful, and she and Maud correctly perform the Transference Spell in sync. Mildred meets her father, Spike Jones, and her younger half-sister Isabella ("Izzy") Jones after saving Izzy on her first day of school during a flying accident involving her broom. She becomes head girl after saving the school from Agatha Cackle at the end of season four, and Ethel has made peace with her.

== Maud Spellbody ==
Maud Spellbody is introduced as Mildred's best friend. Their friendship cools in The Worst Witch Strikes Again after Maud becomes jealous of Mildred's apparent friendship with the new girl, Enid Nightshade. She rekindles her friendship with Mildred after Ethel locks them in a store cupboard and makes friends with Enid. Maud is short and chubby, with glasses and hair worn in bunches; in A Bad Spell for the Worst Witch she wears pigtails, and in The Worst Witch Saves the Day her hair is curly instead of straight. She is loyal to Mildred and Enid and stands up to Ethel many times, most notably in The Worst Witch All at Sea.

Maud's surname varies. In the 1986 film, her surname is Warlock; the 1998 TV series gave her a surname of Moonshine, and Miss Hardbroom scathingly calls her Maud Spellbody in The Worst Witch All at Sea. Later books, including Fun with the Worst Witch (2014), give her surname as Spellbody.

In the 1986 film, Maud is played by Danielle Batchelor. She was played by Emma Brown in the 1998 TV series; in the episode "Learning the Hard Way", she tells Miss Hardbroom that Mildred would never have any confidence if the teacher kept shouting at her. The 2017 TV series popularized Maud's surname as Spellbody; In the 2017 CBBC version of The Worst Witch, plays Maud in Series 2. Meibh Campbell plays her in the series one, and Megan Hughes in series two.

== Enid Nightshade ==
Enid Nightshade, Mildred's second-best friend, is introduced in The Worst Witch Strikes Again. She has large arms and legs and hair "the colour of milky tea", worn in a thick plait. Mildred is assigned to look after her by Miss Cackle. Enid (apparently dull and boring at first) is a wild practical joker who unintentionally causes trouble for Mildred from Miss Cackle. She is as loyal as Maud, however, comforting and supporting Mildred in the following books of the series. Enid is the second-worst witch at the academy; she and Mildred are hapless at broomstick riding and lack the requirements to be a fully-fledged, efficient witch. Enid was played by Jessica Fox in the first TV series, and by Tamara Smart in the BBC reboot.

== Ethel Hallow ==
Ethel Hallow is the snobbish, vindictive, and sly rival of Mildred Hubble and her friends. She is favoured by Miss Hardbroom but has few friends apart from the rarely-seen Drusilla Paddock, who shares similar traits. Ethel is "one of those lucky people for whom everything goes right", contributing to her arrogance.

She is tall and thin (similar to Mildred), with blonde hair worn in a ponytail tied with a black ribbon. Ethel has a pointed nose, a feature noted by Maud in A Bad Spell for the Worst Witch. Her primary weakness as a student is that while she can easily follow rules and perform new spells after a demonstration, she lacks the ability to imagine and improvise. In The Worst Witch to the Rescue, she is the worst student in the art class and has no ideas about a summer project to research a spell – unlike Mildred, who is best in art and creates a new spell for the project.

=== In the books ===
- In The Worst Witch, Ethel is turned into a pig by Mildred after taunting her about her tabby cat's inability to fly on a broomstick. Ethel jinxes the spare broom she lends Mildred in revenge, ruining her performance before Grand Wizard Egbert Hellibore.
- In The Worst Witch Strikes Again, she locks Mildred and Enid in an abandoned store cupboard.
- In A Bad Spell for the Worst Witch, Ethel turns Mildred into a frog to get even with her for calling her younger sister Sybil a weed.
- In The Worst Witch All at Sea, she casts off a boat containing Tabby and an unconscious Miss Hardbroom from the breakwater and nearly causes them to be lost at sea.
- In The Worst Witch Saves the Day, Ethel hides Tabby on the roof, cuts off Mildred's hair, and gives her a hair-regrowth potion that makes her hair grow out of control.
- In The Worst Witch to the Rescue, she gets Mildred banned from art lessons by turning her clay pot into five rattlesnakes out of jealousy. Ethel also steals Mildred's summer project (a spell that allows animals to talk), passing it off as her own. She gets Drusilla to hide Mildred's talking pet tortoise in a tree to prevent him from revealing the truth about the project, but Mildred saves the tortoise and presents him to Miss Cackle and Miss Hardbroom as a witness.
- In The Worst Witch and the Wishing Star, Ethel is promoted to Lantern Monitor in her fourth year with Mildred and Drusilla but is on a tight leash after her previous misdeeds. Realising that Mildred has something hidden in a bag, Ethel exposes Mildred's new pet dog Star; however, the subsequent scuffle destroys the costumes for Form Five's broomstick ballet.

=== In the film and TV series ===
In the 1986 film, Ethel is played by Anna Kipling. She is played by Felicity Jones in the first series and Katy Allen in the second and third series of the 1998 ITV series. Jones later reprised her role in the sequel, Weirdsister College. The explanation for a change of actress in the first episode of the second series, "Old Hats and New Brooms", was Ethel's makeover ("witch-over") during the holidays.

In the 2017 CBBC series, Ethel is played by Jenny Richardson. This version of Ethel is intelligent but driven to prove herself because her elder sister, Esmerelda, is in third year at Cackle's and generally seen as the school's best student. Her vendetta against Mildred begins during the selection-day tests when Ethel's attempt to prove herself by creating a potion that would turn her into a dragon is inadvertently sabotaged by Mildred, who steals part of a key ingredient from Ethel's potion for her levitation spell; Ethel's spell turns her into a worm. Ethel attempts to undermine Mildred and affirm her place in the school, but her attempts at heroism involve making others look bad rather than putting herself at risk. At the end of the series, after Mildred becomes Head Girl, Ethel makes amends with her and they are on good terms.

== Miss Hardbroom ==
Constance Hardbroom is the strict deputy headmistress and potions mistress at the academy. She is tall and thin, with black hair which she keeps "scragged into such a tight knot that her forehead looked quite stretched". Miss Hardbroom is Mildred's form mistress, dislikes her, and favours Ethel. The students refer to her as "HB" and she is known to be able to vanish into thin air.

In the books and other adaptations, Miss Hardbroom's first name is Constance; in the 2017 television adaptation, her name is Joy Hecate Hardbroom and she is the childhood best friend of Indigo Moon. She is played by Diana Rigg in the 1986 film, by Kate Duchêne in the 1998 TV series, by Caroline O'Neill in The New Worst Witch, and by Raquel Cassidy in the 2017 CBBC series.
