= Karen Paullada =

British actress

- Born: Neath, Wales

Karen Paullada is a Welsh actress who has worked extensively in television and theatre roles. She is best known for playing Nadine in the Sky1 TV comedy drama series Stella.

== Filmography ==
=== Film ===
Year	Title	Role	Notes
TBA	Tangled Up in Blue	TBA	Post-production

=== Television ===
Year	Title	Role	Studio	Notes
2012–16	Stella	Nadine Bevan	Sky 1	series 1 – 6
2005	The Green Green Grass	Rhian	BBC1	series 1, 2 episodes
2016	Ordinary Lies	Nina	Red Production Company	Series 2
2020	The Worst Witch	Miss Arabella Hempnettle	CBBC, ZDF, Netflix	Series 4, 6 episodes (main cast)
2023	Steeltown Murders	DSI Jackie Roberts	BBC1	4 episodes
