= The Worst Witch =

Series of children's novels by Jill Murphy

- The covers from the first seven books, shown in publication order.
- The Worst Witch; The Worst Witch Strikes Again; A Bad Spell for the Worst Witch; The Worst Witch All at Sea; The Worst Witch Saves the Day; The Worst Witch to the Rescue; The Worst Witch and the Wishing Star; First Prize for The Worst Witch
- Author: Jill Murphy
- Illustrator: Jill Murphy
- Cover artist: Jill Murphy
- Country: United Kingdom
- Language: English
- Genre: Fantasy, children's books
- Publisher: Allison & Busby (original); Puffin Books (current)
- Published: 1974–2018
- No. of books: 8

The Worst Witch is a series of children's books written and illustrated by English author Jill Murphy. The series are boarding school stories in a fantasy setting, with eight books published. The first, The Worst Witch, was published in 1974 by Allison & Busby, and the most recent, First Prize for the Worst Witch, was published in 2018 by Puffin Books, the current publisher of the series. The books have become some of the most successful titles on the Young Puffin paperback list and have sold more than 5 million copies.

In 1986, the first book in the series was made into a television film of the same name. A TV series based on the book aired from 1998 to 2001, and has inspired two spin-offs, Weirdsister College, aired in 2001, and The New Worst Witch, aired in 2005. Another adaptation premiered in 2017.

== Background ==
The author Jill Murphy began writing The Worst Witch at the age of 15, while still at school, and based many points of the stories on her own school experiences at Ursuline Convent in Wimbledon, England, with Singing becoming Chanting, Chemistry becoming Potions and so on. Recalling how the story was initially inspired by her own school experiences, she said in an interview: "My two friends and I used to come home in our dark uniforms, looking very scruffy at the end of the day – my dark plaits sprouting tufts, with lost hair ribbons. My Mum used to say 'Look at you all. You look like the three witches!' and it gave me the idea for a witch's school – so that it was exactly like my school, but with a subtle touch of magic. All the characters are based on my school friends (and enemies) and teachers".

Murphy completed the first book at the age of 18, but it was rejected by many publishers (on the grounds that children would find a book about a school for witches too "scary"), so she "put it in a drawer" and concentrated on other things, including working as a nanny and in a children's home, and for a time living in West Africa, where her first husband was studying.

Publication of The Worst Witch finally came about, as Jill Murphy recalled, "thanks to a series of coincidences involving me spending time in Ghana, and a friend meeting Margaret Busby (Ghanaian herself, and considering starting a children's list for her imprint) at a publishers' party in London". The Worst Witch was finally published in 1974, when Murphy was 24, by the small independent company Allison and Busby.

== Series overview ==
The books in the series all focus on Mildred Hubble, a young witch who attends Miss Cackle's Academy for Witches, a school of magic. Although well-intentioned, Mildred's clumsy personality leads the girl to disastrous situations, and she is thus considered the worst student in the school. The benevolent headmistress, Miss Cackle, is generally understanding, whereas Mildred's form teacher Miss Hardbroom thinks she just is not trying hard enough. Mildred's friends include Maud Spellbody, a rotund, sensible girl who is always trying to avoid confusion, and Enid Nightshade, a practical joker who is more likely than Mildred to get them all into trouble. The three girls have a strong rivalry with Ethel Hallow, a high-born, snobbish and vindictive classmate.

Each book covers one term at the school. There are two terms each year: the Winter term, from September to January, and the Summer term, from March to July. In First Prize for the Worst Witch, the most recent book, Mildred is in the Summer term of her fourth year.

== Books ==
=== The Worst Witch ===
The Worst Witch (ISBN 978-0850311426) was first published in 1974 by Allison & Busby, and proved to be an immediate success, selling out within two months.

Plot

The novel begins with Mildred Hubble and the upcoming traditional assembly where all of the first-years are given their own black cats that they will teach to ride on their broomsticks with them. Unlike the other girls, who receive black kittens, Mildred receives a tabby cat, which she simply calls Tabby. The kitten is unable to sit on a broomstick, so Mildred carries Tabby in her bag. Miss Hardbroom disapproves, and Mildred has to stop. Afterwards, another witch called Ethel Hallow teases Mildred about it and dares her to turn her into a frog. Mildred loses her temper and turns Ethel into a pig instead.

In the next chapter, Mildred and Maud inadvertently make an invisibility potion instead of a laughing potion in their class test.

In the following chapter, the girls are practising for a broomstick display for Halloween. Ethel lends Mildred her spare broom, on which she has secretly put a spell. During the Halloween festival, Mildred's broom starts bucking, causing all the girls to fall from their broomsticks. The Chief Magician denounces the academy, and Mildred is summoned to a meeting with Miss Cackle and Miss Hardbroom the next morning. Mildred, fearing expulsion, decides to run away with Tabby.

When walking through the forests near the academy, Mildred hears voices through the trees and comes across a group of witches, headed by one who looks like Miss Cackle. After hearing their plot to turn every teacher and student witch in the academy into frogs, Mildred turns the group into snails, packs them into cardboard boxes, and takes them back to the academy. At first, Miss Cackle and Miss Hardbroom refuse to believe her, but when Mildred describes the leader, Miss Cackle realises she sounds like her identical twin sister, Agatha. They turn Agatha and her associates back into humans. Mildred's interview is cancelled for saving the school. Later that morning, Ethel is exposed as the cause of Mildred's broomstick mishap, and Mildred is vindicated and praised as a hero to the rest of the academy.

=== The Worst Witch Strikes Again ===
The Worst Witch Strikes Again (ISBN 978-0850312515) was first published in 1980 by Allison & Busby and features a new character, Enid Nightshade.

Plot

Mildred Hubble returns to Miss Cackle's Academy for Witches for the Summer Term of her first year. Miss Cackle has trusted Mildred to look after the new girl, Enid Nightshade, and help her settle in. Since Mildred has to spend a lot of time with Enid, Maud becomes angry and jealous and breaks off their friendship, siding with Ethel in retaliation.

Mildred starts showing Enid around the academy, only to discover that Enid has smuggled a monkey into school with her. During the assembly that follows, Miss Cackle announces her birthday celebration. During a chanting lesson with Miss Bat after assembly, Enid deliberately sings awkwardly and out of tune, causing Mildred to burst into laughter. Mildred is sent to Miss Cackle's office. When going up to her room, Mildred checks on Enid's monkey, causing it to escape. Mildred chases it down the stairs and bumps into Miss Hardbroom, who sends her to the library to study.

After spotting the monkey on top of one of the castle towers, Mildred jumps onto her broomstick. Miss Hardbroom turns the monkey into its original form, a school regulation black cat. Enid secretly reveals to Mildred that she turned the cat into a monkey for fun.

On Sports Day, Mildred and Enid become partners. Enid places a spell on Mildred's pole, so in the pole-vaulting contest, Mildred springs high into the air and lands into Miss Hardbroom's study via the window. Moments later, Miss Cackle, Miss Hardbroom, and Miss Drill arrive, and Miss Cackle angrily says that if there is any more bother from Mildred that term, she will be expelled.

Determined to avoid expulsion for the rest of the term, Mildred refuses every daring suggestion Enid makes. Enid decides to skip Miss Cackle's boring birthday celebration and hides in a store cupboard, pulling Mildred in with her. Seeing an opportunity to get Mildred expelled, Ethel Hallow spitefully locks the door behind them.

Inside the cupboard, the two girls find an old broomstick that they use to fly out of a slit-window leading into the assembly hall. As luck has it, Maud is on stage, having been chosen to recite the first years' contribution to the recital. Having long regretted her jealous behaviour, Maud introduces Mildred and Enid as a surprise broomstick display item. The display doesn't go especially well, but Miss Cackle decides it is the thought and effort that counts and praises them highly. The three girls become friends and are delighted when the end-of-term bell rings with Mildred still a pupil at the academy.

=== A Bad Spell for the Worst Witch ===
A Bad Spell for the Worst Witch (ISBN 978-0-7226-5763-8) was published in 1982. It features Ethel Hallow's little sister, Sybil Hallow, and her friend Clarice Crow.

Plot

Mildred Hubble returns to Miss Cackle's Academy for Witches for her second year, determined to lose her embarrassing reputation as "the worst witch in the school". After Maud Spellbody and Enid Nightshade arrive, the three bump into two first-years (one of whom reminds Mildred very strongly of someone, the other with ginger frizzy hair in bunches). The one who seems familiar bursts into tears and clings onto Mildred when she hears that many of the teachers (including Miss Hardbroom) are quite strict. Mildred also accidentally slips a made-up story about Miss Hardbroom turning a student into a frog when she was just two seconds late for a lesson. To the girls' horror, they also learn that they have Miss Hardbroom for another year.

The next morning, a fire bell rings. Mildred scrambles into her clothes, notices from her window that Miss Hardbroom standing in the playground surrounded by hazy purple smoke. Thinking she is in a state of shock, Mildred tries to douse her in freezing cold water, but the bucket slips off her broomstick and lands with a clang on Miss Hardbroom's head. After witnessing the incident, Ethel Hallow confronts Mildred at lunchtime, saying that the girl she told the frog story to was her younger sister, Sybil. After much provocation, Mildred loses her temper and insults Ethel's family —"All you Hallows are weeds, weeds, weeds!"

After an unfortunate flying lesson, where Tabby makes another terrified attempt to avoid sitting on the end of the broomstick, Miss Hardbroom sends Mildred to her room to calm down. When sitting in her bed, however, Mildred accidentally falls asleep and does not hear Ethel creeping into her room.

Mildred is awoken by her bedroom door shutting, only to find that everything looks giant-sized, even Tabby. Peeking in the mirror, she finds that somebody has turned her into a frog. When jumping onto her bed, the frog-Mildred notices a tatty handful of weeds on her pillow, no doubt left by Ethel as a reference to her family's insult and why she turned her into the frog.

Panicking, Mildred squeezes under the gap under her bedroom door and hops off to a potions lesson, where everyone has noticed her disappearance. Miss Hardbroom, however, discovers her and puts her in a jar. During the lesson, Mildred manages to escape from the jar and hops over to Ethel's desk, where she drinks an invisibility potion. Taking advantage of her invisibility, the frog-Mildred hops out of the academy and lands in the lily pond on the castle grounds.

There, Mildred meets another frog who was also a human once called Algernon Rowan-Webb (though he has been a frog for so long he can barely remember his surname). Algernon reveals that, rather like Mildred, he was turned into a frog by a fellow magician after an argument and can only be turned back into a human by another magician. Algernon also reveals that the one thing he craves is to have a "proper tea again, with buttered toast and crumpets with honey".

Promising to return for him, Mildred hops back up to the academy. Maud and Enid, who have been worrying about their friends' disappearance, suddenly realise what has happened when Tabby shows affection towards the frog-Mildred, and take her to Ethel, who reluctantly turns her back into a human. Miss Hardbroom comes by, and Ethel tells her that she caught Maud, Enid, and Mildred sneaking around the school. Mildred furiously attempts to tell the truth, and the disbelieving Miss Hardbroom is about to give her a punishment when she notices that Mildred's feet are still invisible. Mildred realises that this proves her story and tells Miss Hardbroom what happened in the potion lab. Miss Hardbroom tells Mildred and Ethel to report to her office the next day.

In the morning, Miss Hardbroom reprimands both Mildred and Ethel for their ongoing feud, and they are both punished with lines – Ethel for turning Mildred into a frog and attempting to lie her way out of trouble, and Mildred for upsetting Ethel's sister. The two girls are also banned from attending the Halloween ceremonies – the only chance Mildred would have had to find a magician who could turn Algernon back into a human. Mildred feels she has no choice but to kidnap somebody who is going to the Halloween festival. She tricks a third-year witch, Griselda Blackwood, into looking under her bed for an imaginary beetle before tying her up and taking her cat.

Shortly afterwards, Ethel discovers Griselda being held captive in Mildred's room, and the two fly off to the festival to turn Mildred in. When exposed, Mildred takes the plunge and strides up to chief magician Mr Hellibore, handing him the box that contains Algernon. As luck would have it, Mr Hellibore was one of Algernon's fellow magicians at the time of his transformation, and he immediately turns him old friend back to his human form.

As a last request from Mildred, Mr Hellibore magics up a pot of tea and a plate of toast, crumpets, and butter. Algernon himself then conjures a pot of honey for the crumpets and the three head off to enjoy the supper.

=== The Worst Witch All at Sea ===
The Worst Witch All at Sea (ISBN 978-0-670-83253-8) was published in 1993. It is the only book in the series not set in Miss Cackle's Academy for Witches, but by the sea instead.

Plot

Mildred Hubble returns to Miss Cackle's Academy for Witches for the Summer Term of her second year. Instead of the usual black-and-grey-checked dresses, Miss Hardbroom persuaded Miss Cackle to change them to plain black. After crash-landing in a pile of snow and meeting up with her best friends, Maud Spellbody and Enid Nightshade, Ethel Hallow appears and tells Mildred that Miss Cackle wants to see her.

Miss Cackle suggests to Mildred that she replaces Tabby. Last term, a third-year witch, Fenella Feverfew, transferred to Miss Pentangle's Academy several mountaintops away and left behind her sleek black cat, Ebony, since they have owls at Miss Pentangle's instead of black cats. Down in the kitchens, Mildred reluctantly hands over Tabby to Miss Tapioca (to catch mice), who gives her Ebony in return. Mildred is too upset to tell either Maud or Enid about it until after assembly.

Miss Hardbroom announces that Mr Rowan-Webb, the frog-magician whom Mildred saved from the lily pond the previous term, has invited all the second-years to spend a week's holiday at his castle, Gloom Castle at Grim Cove.

On the morning of departure, unable to bear the thought of a week without Tabby, Mildred sneaks down into the school kitchens, lets Ebony out of his cage, and instead hides Tabby inside.

When they reach Gloom Castle, they find that it is falling apart: the armchairs have springs and stuffing sticking out and there are no proper beds (apart from one, which Ethel Hallow immediately claims) other than old sleeping-bags, piles of pillows, and what appear to be hospital trolleys. Mildred gets an old sleeping-bag under the window and realises she must divert attention away from Tabby.

Mildred spots a boat attached to a breakwater and decides to hide Tabby in the cabin of the boat. After a wonderful day on the beach, Mildred tries to sneak some kippers to Tabby, but Ethel catches Mildred, who pretends to be looking for some mythical treasure on Cat's Head Rock in front of the cove in the boat on the breakwater. As the two head back up the cliff stairs, they witness Miss Hardbroom flying down to the beach on her broomstick with her own black cat, Morgana. Morgana runs to the boat and feeds on the kippers that were meant for Tabby. Miss Hardbroom spots both Tabby in the cabin and Morgana eating the fish. Stepping on board to investigate, she slips on a kipper, hits her head, and falls unconscious.

Sneaking out to feed Tabby again, Mildred is confronted by Ethel, who snidely tells her that she has untied the boat and let it drift out to sea. Mildred uses a broomstick that she finds on the beach (not realising it is Miss Hardbroom's) to fly out to the drifting boat, where she discovers not only Tabby but the comatose Miss Hardbroom. Minutes after, they bump into Cat's Head Rock. Mildred ties the boat onto an odd-looking chunk of rock and falls asleep.

When she awakens, she finds that Maud and Enid have discovered them. Mildred tells them that there is something strange about the rock the boat is tied to. They pull at it and find that it is the mythical treasure chest.

When they get back, Miss Hardbroom has revived, and her injured head is bandaged. The contents of the treasure chest are used both to repair Gloom Castle and to refurbish Cackle's Academy, and Mildred is permitted to keep Tabby again as a reward.

Mildred enjoys the rest of her holiday, feeling like "the luckiest girl in the world instead of the worst witch in the school".

=== The Worst Witch Saves the Day ===
The Worst Witch Saves the Day (ISBN 978-0-14-138218-0) was published in 2005. It features Agatha Cackle disguised as new teacher Miss Granite.

Plot

Mildred Hubble is returning to Miss Cackle's Academy for Witches on the first day of her third year. After meeting up with her friends, Maud Spellbody and Enid Nightshade, Mildred sees that Maud's hair is curly (she borrowed a hairstyling brush from her aunt) and they also learn that they will have a new form-teacher this year other than Miss Hardbroom.

They see in assembly that their new form-teacher will be Miss Granite, who was hired by Miss Cackle after Miss Gribble failed to show discipline and against Miss Hardbroom's advice. Miss Granite is described as being very strange-looking and having "a huge cloud of orange curls" and also wearing "enormous purple-tinted glasses and a short cape with a collar turned up so high that you couldn't see much of her face at all". Miss Granite speaks in a very high-pitched, squeaky voice that shocks everyone, including Ethel Hallow.

Mildred unravels her pigtails to try out Maud's styling brush. Maud and Enid find her with her hair loose, and a chunk of her hair tangled up with the brush in a huge mess. Ethel comes in and volunteers to help. However, the "help" amounts to taking a pair of scissors and chopping off both the styling brush and the messy hair.

Ethel later offers to help Mildred again in her hair predicament. She formulates a potion that she claims will restore Mildred's hair to its rightful length. Mildred applies the potion that night, and just when she is dropping off to sleep, her hair starts growing longer and longer by the minute, engulfing the whole school. Miss Hardbroom comes to investigate, states that Mildred is having "a bad hair day", manages to stop the hair growing and cuts it to its rightful length and vapourises the swathes of hair that had engulfed the whole school.

In a flying lesson, Ethel steals Tabby (who has been suffering a nervous breakdown as a result of the hair incident) and hides him on the roof in front of Miss Granite's study's window.

That night, when trying to recover Tabby, Mildred is locked in a cupboard by someone who seems to be Miss Cackle but is actually Miss Cackle's identical twin Agatha Cackle, who sneaked into the school disguised as Miss Granite. Agatha is trying to turn all the teachers and pupils into snails. Mildred manages to turn herself into an ant, sneaks out of the cupboard, and goes to Maud's room, where she tries unsuccessfully to wake her. Fortunately, she is able to attract Maud and Enid's attention by using ink-blots to write two notes – "HELP NOT ANT" attracting their attention to her and "FORGOT SPEL" clarifying her dilemma – and Maud and Enid turn her back into a human. Mildred tells them what is going on, and just as Agatha is about to turn Miss Cackle into a snail, Mildred turns her into a snail herself. They also bump into Miss Hardbroom, who had been away.

Miss Hardbroom suggests that Miss Cackle poses as Agatha and invites Agatha's rebellious coven in, whereupon Mildred and the others will turn them all into snails, which happens. As Mildred, Maud, and Enid go back to bed, they realise that they miss Miss Hardbroom as their form-teacher. She suddenly appears in front of them and is friendly for a brief moment, admitting she has missed them too, before strictly telling them to get back to bed with no candles on.

=== The Worst Witch to the Rescue ===
The Worst Witch to the Rescue (ISBN 978-0-14-138301-9) was published in 2007 and features Ethel Hallow's only friend, Drusilla Paddock, in a largely increased role since her brief cameo in The Worst Witch All at Sea.

Plot

Ethel Hallow is returning to Miss Cackle's Academy for Witches for the Summer Term of her third year. Miss Hardbroom had previously set them a holiday project, but Ethel is doing exactly what Miss Hardbroom told them not to do: trying to think up a project in five minutes flat on the way back to school. Ethel spots Mildred Hubble crash-landed in a tree and manages to help her steady herself. Mildred explains to Ethel her project: a spell that can make animals talk, though it can only work on animals that fit into 25 centimetres and only lasts for two weeks. When helping Mildred out of the tree, Ethel knocks Mildred's luggage out of the tree. While Mildred tries to get Tabby, who had scampered up the tree, Ethel scoops up Mildred's project folder and art bag and her 30 coloured pencils.

On the way there, Mildred finds her friends Maud Spellbody and Enid Nightshade. When Mildred tells them about Ethel being nice for a change, Enid suggests she may have taken a "niceness course" during the holidays. Maud and Enid become suspicious when they catch Mildred talking to someone or something in her cat basket.

The girls find that their new form mistress is called Miss Mould, who has a "soft and kindly" voice and "short mousy hair parted in the middle and pulled into a ponytail at her neck". She is a great relief from the horrifically strict Miss Hardbroom and the extremely weird Miss Granite whom they had had the previous term. Mildred sits next to Drusilla Paddock, who swaps places with Ethel after Miss Mould tells Ethel her coils are too short. Minutes later, a maraca-like noise echoes through the classroom. Mildred finds that her coils have turned into five rattlesnakes. Miss Mould gets the whole class outside while Ethel stays inside and evaporates the rattlesnakes. Just then, Miss Hardbroom appears, and Miss Mould explains what happened. Miss Hardbroom sends Mildred to her room and bans her from art lessons for the rest of the term. Mildred runs to her room, where she figures out it must have been Ethel, who turned her pot and coils into the snakes out of jealousy. The next day, in a lesson with Miss Hardbroom, the girls are presenting their projects to the class. Ethel goes first, but her project is the same as Mildred's. Mildred shouts to Miss Hardbroom that Ethel had stolen her project. Miss Hardbroom opens Mildred's project folder but finds only many sheets of paper with smiley faces drawn on them in different colours. Miss Hardbroom "transfers" Mildred to her room.

Later, Mildred finds that the creature inside her cat basket, a tortoise called Speedy whom she had used her spell on, can still speak. She renames him Einstein, and he tells her about overhearing her conversation with Ethel inside the tree. After Mildred runs to tell Maud and Enid the good news, Mildred accidentally leaves her bedroom door open, and Einstein escapes. While plodding along the corridor, he is discovered by Drusilla Paddock, who takes him to Ethel's room. While Ethel and Drusilla talk, it is revealed that Ethel did indeed take Mildred's project and had also "tried out" a snake spell on Mildred's pot and coils in art. Einstein overhears everything.

When they are taking Einstein back to Mildred, Ethel eavesdrops on what Mildred is telling Maud and Enid. After discovering that Einstein can still speak and had overheard the conversation between Ethel and Mildred about the project, and that Einstein only has one more day before the spell wears off and he becomes mute forever, Ethel orders Drusilla to hide Einstein in the hollow pine tree outside the school gates. Einstein is put into a cardboard box that also contains a small green frog called Cyril, the animal whom Ethel had used in her demonstration. Cyril escapes and hops to Mildred's room. Cyril tells Mildred that Drusilla hid Einstein in the hollow pine tree outside the school gates and that he overheard several conversations about stealing projects and turning pots into snakes.

After releasing Cyril into the woods, Mildred gets on her broomstick and, during a violent thunderstorm, finds and rescues Einstein. On landing, she is confronted by Miss Hardbroom, who takes Mildred and Einstein inside and, after hearing part of the incidents from Mildred, sets an interview with Mildred and Ethel the next morning.

The next morning, Mildred goes to Miss Cackle's office where Einstein, resting in Miss Cackle's overflowing in-tray, awakes and tells Miss Cackle and Miss Hardbroom that he overheard the conversation between Ethel and Mildred in the tree. He also says that he heard Ethel telling Drusilla that she had tried out a snake spell on Mildred's coils and had taken Mildred's project, copied it out in her own writing, and then thrown it in the kitchen bins. Ethel sifts through the rubbish and eventually finds Mildred's tea-stained project. Miss Hardbroom makes Ethel apologise to Mildred in assembly in front of the whole year as an alternative to being expelled for cheating as well as for her actions that put herself and Mildred in great danger.

During a broomstick-flying lesson, Mildred reveals to Maud and Enid that Miss Cackle had provided Miss Mould's classroom with a proper kiln and craft room and she also got to keep Einstein as a pet. As the clock strikes midday, Mildred sprints into her room and hears Einstein speak for the last time in his raspy little voice ("I'm glad I belong to you"), before munching on his carrot and going silent forever.

=== The Worst Witch and the Wishing Star ===
The Worst Witch and the Wishing Star (Scholastic UK, ISBN 978-0-141351995; another (?), ISBN 978-0-141383996) was released by Scholastic UK in 2013.

Returning from the holidays in stormy weather Mildred, Maud and Enid arrive to be told by Miss Drill that there will be a talent-displaying competition between Miss Cackle's Academy, Moonridge and Pentangle's school to win a swimming-pool as the award for the best talent.

Mildred, much to her disappointment, has been chosen to work lantern monitor along with Drusilla and Ethel. On that first night, Maud spots a shooting star, and Mildred makes a wish, followed by Miss Hardbroom, who does the same reluctantly. On the first lantern monitor shift, Mildred is given a holdall containing safety objects in it. When she reaches the gates to finish the job, Mildred spots a stray dog, who she names Star. She takes him to her bedroom as a secret pet, much to the disapproval of Tabby.

During the weeks that follow Mildred, realising that Star is well behaved and calm on a broomstick, she trains him to do various tricks with her. Maud and Enid, who realise Mildred isn't spending much time with them, soon discover about Star and are amazed by the tricks Mildred has taught him. Ethel, suspicious about Mildred hiding something in her holdall, reaches into it to discover Star was hidden in it and the both of them collapse into the lanterns igniting the costumes Form Five have made for the talent competition.

Miss Hardbroom, furious, sends Ethel and Mildred along with Star on a lead to Miss Cackle's office for what they had done. Maud and Enid then explain about Star's tricks on the broom. Miss Cackle accepts the replacing talent, and the next day, the competition took place with the schools showing their talents. When it's Mildred's turn, she amazes the judges with Star's tricks and wins the competition and the swimming pool. When the pupils go back to their school, Miss Cackle allows Mildred to keep Star as her broomstick companion as a special privilege. Mildred later explains to Miss Hardbroom that she wished for Star on the shooting star at the beginning of term, which doesn't annoy her as she wished on the star for them to win the competition. The story concludes with the teachers celebrating their victory and, at the same time, Miss Hardbroom's birthday.

=== First Prize for the Worst Witch ===
First Prize for the Worst Witch (ISBN 9780141355092) was published in 2018. Its writing was delayed when Murphy underwent cancer treatment.

Heading back to Miss Cackle's Academy at the start of the summer term of the fourth year, Mildred is feeling much more confident thanks to her new broomstick companion, Star the dog, new-found flying skill, and recent successes such as winning a swimming pool for the school. She confesses to Maud that she even dreams of being selected as Head Girl for next year at the end-of-term prizegiving, though they both concede it seems incredibly unlikely; even without considering Mildred's long career of mishaps, they find it impossible to imagine anyone but Ethel Hallow taking the position. Not only is Ethel academically easily the strongest member of her year, but every member of the Hallow family to attend the school for the past two centuries has held the position of Head Girl.

However, Mildred quickly discovers that her nemesis Ethel Hallow has gotten hold of a flyer from a local circus that suggests that her pet Star is their lost property, and has given it to Miss Cackle and Miss Hardbroom. The teachers tell Mildred that they have no choice but to contact the circus and, if necessary, return the dog. When the circus owners, Mr and Mrs Brilliantine, arrive, they confirm that Star is their missing circus dog Binky, and Mildred is devastated to have to turn her beloved dog over to them, particularly as it is clear that he desperately wants to stay with Mildred.

Losing the talented Star and having to return to using the terrified Tabby as her broom companion ruins Mildred's recent flying skills, and with her confidence shattered she also sinks back to her previous position at the bottom of most of her classes. After several months she sneaks out very early one morning along with Enid and Maud to go find Star at the Brilliantines' circus and see how he is doing. Star's excited barking at seeing Mildred wakes the Brilliantines, who understand why Mildred would want to visit her former pet, and give the girls a tour of their circus. As well as Star the circus features a horse and a seal. The Brilliantines concede that the circus life is hard on the animals, but that they can't give them up, as without them they would have lost most of their acts.

Mildred makes a second visit on her own with the purpose of casting the animal-speaking spell she previously invented on all three animals, all of whom beg her to take them away from the circus. She promises them that she will, but it is weeks before Enid hits of the idea of offering the Brilliantines a set of enchanted brooms and brushes to use in their acts instead of the animals. The Brilliantines love the magical items, and cheerfully sign the animals over to Mildred, who attempts to teleport the seal to her colony in Grim Cove (though she accidentally teleports it to the school's new swimming pool, and Miss Hardbroom has to remedy this later), and takes Star and the horse Merlin back to school.

At school Mildred tries to convince Miss Cackle and Miss Hardbroom to let her keep Star and for the school to adopt Merlin. Ethel complicates matters by telling the teachers about how Mildred and her friends traded enchanted items for them, hoping to get Mildred in trouble both for stealing school property and for 'trivial usage of magic'. Ultimately, though, Miss Cackle convinces Miss Hardbroom that using magic to find a way to free her pet and other animals from an unpleasant life of servitude could hardly be considered 'trivial', and that Mildred's inventiveness and determination to solve problems are attributes that should not be overlooked...

At the final day of term's prizegiving event for Fourth Years Ethel unsurprisingly sweeps all of the academic awards, though Maud manages to win the prize for Team Spirit, which delights her and the entire school (aside from Ethel). However, when it comes to the award for Head Girl everyone is shocked when Miss Cackle announces that Mildred Hubble will be next year's Head Girl. When she finally gets over her amazement Mildred picks Enid to be her deputy. After prizegiving ends and the girls prepare to head home, Mildred, Maud and Enid are shocked once again when Miss Hardbroom congratulates them personally, albeit in her own acerbic manner.

== Setting ==
The stories mainly take place within the walls of Miss Cackle's Academy for Witches, a girls-only boarding magic school that is described in the books as a stone castle on top of a mountain, surrounded by pine forest.

The school year is divided into two terms: the Winter term (September–January) and the Summer term (March–July), with a month's holiday between them. Students start at Cackle's at the age of 12 and finish at the age of 17 for a total of five school years. The students arrive at the start of the term by flying broomsticks, except for the new first years, who walk through the walker's gate as they can't fly yet. Halfway through the first term, the first years are each presented with a black kitten – Mildred receives a grey-and-black tabby cat as they apparently ran out of purely black cats – which they teach to ride the broomstick. The first book postulates that the cats weren't for any practical purpose except to keep tradition going, and in Wishing Star, a group of elder witches note that there is no restriction on what animal a witch must have as her flight companion, with cats only being traditional as they are discreet and easy to care for, which leads to Mildred being permitted to fly with her dog, Star, after he shows greater broom aptitude than her cat Tabby. At the end of the first year, each pupil receives a copy of The Popular Book of Spells, a three-inch thick volume bound in black leather. This was not really to be used, as they already had paperback editions for the classroom, but like the cats, it's another piece of tradition. At the end of the fifth and final year, students sit the exams for the W.H.C. (Witches' Higher Certificate), and most pupils were awarded with the certificate.

The first book says that the school winter uniform is composed of "black gymslips, black stockings, black hob-nailed boots, grey shirts and black-and-grey ties". The first book also postulates that "the only touches of colour [on the uniforms] were the sashes round their gymslips – a different colour for each house, although the houses are not named – and the school badge, which was a black cat sitting on a yellow moon". In the summer term, originally the girls wore grey-and-black checked dresses, but this was changed from Worst Witch All At Sea onwards to a simple black dress as Ms Hardbroom felt that the original design was too frivolous (the girls didn't agree, though).

== Adaptations ==
=== Television film ===
In 1986, the first book in the series was converted to a made-for-television film on ITV starring Fairuza Balk, Tim Curry, Diana Rigg, and Charlotte Rae. Though a British film, it also aired in the USA on HBO. The film followed the plot of the first book of the series, portraying the incidents of Mildred turning herself invisible and turning Ethel into a pig, Miss Cackle's evil twin sister Agatha plotting to take over the school, and the Grand Wizard viewing the Halloween Broomstick formation (sabotaged by Ethel's faulty broom she lent to Mildred). It was shot at St. Michael's College in Tenbury Wells. This holiday special later aired on the Disney Channel every year for Halloween until the late 1990s. Its opening song, "Growing Up Isn't Easy", was sung by Bonnie Langford; its music was composed by Charles Strouse and its lyrics were written by Don Black. Their other musical number was "Anything Can Happen on Halloween", sung by Tim Curry. Denis King composed its incidental music score and also wrote the song "My Little School".

=== Television series (1998–2001) ===
The Worst Witch, a TV series based on the books, starring Georgina Sherrington and Felicity Jones as Mildred Hubble and Ethel Hallow respectively. Jones left the role after season two and was replaced by Katy Allen. The series was broadcast from 1998 to 2001. It was shot in Montreal, London and Cardiff. The series is mostly shot in studio in London, with some episodes filmed in Montreal, Quebec, Canada. The exteriors of Cackle's Academy used Castell Coch, a castle located near Cardiff. The courtyard was filmed at Loseley Park, near Guildford. Inside the school (Great Hall, classrooms etc.) was filmed at Twickenham Studios.

==== Spin-offs ====
When it was no longer realistic that Mildred would still be at school, the series relocated her to a magical university in Cambridge and was retitled Weirdsister College: The Further Adventures of the Worst Witch and saw the return of Felicity Jones as a reinvented Ethel Hallow.

In 2004, a new series based on the 1998 series was made, entitled The New Worst Witch. It centred on the adventures of Mildred's equally bungling cousin, Henrietta "Hettie" Hubble, played by Alice Connor, also set at Cackle's Academy.

=== Television series (2017–2020) ===
A new version of The Worst Witch TV series began in 2017 airing on CBBC (later made available on Netflix) and concluded in 2020, this one starring Bella Ramsey as Mildred Hubble (replaced by Lydia Page in the fourth season so that Ramsey could focus on personal issues), Claire Higgins as Miss Cackle, and Raquel Cassidy as Miss Hardbroom.

=== Stage adaptation (2018–2019) ===
A musical stage production called The Worst Witch Live, adapted by Emma Reeves from Murphy's original books, was shown at the Royal & Derngate Theatre in Northampton from 27 November to 30 December 2018. In February 2019, the show began to tour the UK across 16 different venues. The Worst Witch Live by Kenny Wax Family Entertainment was shown at the Vaudeville Theatre in the West End from 24 July to 8 September 2019. The original cast included Danielle Bird, Polly Lister, Rachel Heaton, Rebecca Killick, Rosie Abraham, Anna Crichlow, Molly-Grace Cutler, Megan Leigh Mason, Emma Lau, and Meg Forgan.

This version is presented as a publicity play written by Mildred and acted out by the students and staff playing themselves, initially recreating Mildred's first year at school, although the second half takes on a metafictional angle as Agatha Cackle "infiltrates" the play and attempts to stage a coup of the magical government. The stage production received a 2020 Olivier Award for best family show.

== See also ==
- Boarding schools in fiction
- School story
- Little Witch Academia
- Harry Potter
