= Raquel Cassidy =

English actress

- Born: 22 January 1968 (age 58); Fleet, Hampshire, England
- Education: Farnborough Hill; Girton College, Cambridge
- Occupation: Actress
- Years active: 1997–present

Raquel Cassidy is an English actress. She played the role of Phyllis Baxter in the television series Downton Abbey (2013–2015), winning a Screen Actors Guild Award for Outstanding Performance by an Ensemble in a Drama Series. She has reprised the role for both the 2019 feature film of the same name and its 2022 and 2025 sequels.

She has played leading roles in other television series, including Teachers, Party Animals, Moving Wallpaper, Lead Balloon, The Worst Witch and The Good Karma Hospital.

== Early life and education ==
Born to a Spanish mother and an English father, she was the third child and only daughter born to the couple. Born and brought up in Fleet, Hampshire, she was educated at Farnborough Hill Convent, and then Girton College, Cambridge, where she studied modern languages. She later began a PhD degree in biological anthropology, but abandoned it to pursue a career in acting.

== Career ==
In an early role, Cassidy played Lola Chaves in an episode of The Bill, speaking predominantly in Spanish. In 2001, she took the role of Susan Gately in Teachers, returning for the second series in 2002. She has also played the Home Office Junior Minister Jo Porter in Party Animals, Cassie Turner in The Worst Week of My Life, Nancy Weeks in Moving Wallpaper and Mel in Lead Balloon.

In 2013, Cassidy joined the cast of Downton Abbey, playing the role of rehabilitated thief and lady's maid Phyllis Baxter for the show's final three series. In 2015, the cast won a Screen Actors Guild Award for Outstanding Performance by an Ensemble in a Drama Series. She reprised the role for the show's 2019 feature film, also called Downton Abbey, its 2022 sequel, Downton Abbey: A New Era, and its 2025 conclusion, Downton Abbey: The Grand Finale.

She has subsequently played the role of Miss Hardbroom in four series of the 2017 television revival of The Worst Witch. In 2022, she appeared in series 4 of The Good Karma Hospital as Frankie Martin. In 2023, she played Maria Swanson in an episode of British crime drama series The Chelsea Detective.

== Filmography ==
=== Film ===
Year	Title	Role	Notes
1999	Perdie	Miss Jennings	Short film
2002	Shooters	Tess	
2002	Before You Go	Felicia	
2002	Do I Love You?	Romy	
2004	Out of Time	Alice	Short films
2005	Blake's Junction 7	Jenna	Short films
2005	Festival	Petra Loewenberg	
2007	Tick Tock Lullaby	Maya	
2007	The Boat People	Alice	
2008	Nightwalking	Martha	Short films
2010	An Act of Love	Catherine	Short films
2010	Bleach	Rebecca	Short films
2012	Routine Vaccination	Nurse	Short films
2013	Wisdom	Emily Eximo	Short films
2013	To Leech	Mary	Short films
2014	The Ballad of Langley Lane	Mother	Short films
2016	The Twisted Death of a Lonely Madman	Mystic-57 (voice)	
2016	Two Is a Family	Maitresse Gloria	
2019	Downton Abbey	Phyllis Baxter	
2019	Cliffs of Freedom	Christina Vakrinos	
2019	Official Secrets	Anne Emmerson	
2022	Downton Abbey: A New Era	Phyllis Baxter	
2023	Ferryman	Mother	
2025	Downton Abbey: The Grand Finale	Phyllis Baxter	

=== Television ===
Year	Title	Role	Notes
1998	Killer Net	P.C. Pam Boxer	Mini-series; 2 episodes
1999	The Bill	Lola Chaves	Episode: "Lola"
1999	Peak Practice	Cheryl Parker	Episode: "Hearts and Minds"
2000	Nature Boy	Ros	Mini-series; episode 2
2000	Hearts and Bones	Mary Jones	Episode: "Once There Was a Way to Get Back Home"
2000	Thin Ice	DS Beckett	Television film
2001	Table 12	Yolanda	Episode: "Aphrodisiac"
2001–2002	Teachers	Susan Gately	Series 1 & 2; 18 episodes
2003	Trust	Elizabeth Blackwood	Mini-series; episode 2
2003	Red Cap	Staff Sgt. Neve Kirland	5 episodes
2003	Holby City	Julie Redding	Episode: "Desperate Measures"
2003	Trevor's World of Sport	Caroline Bradley	3 episodes
2004	The Worst Week of My Life	Cassie Turner	7 episodes
2005	According to Bex	Chris	8 episodes
2005	Last Rights	Nadine	Mini-series; 3 episodes
2005	Twisted Tales	Lynne	Episode: "Murder Me"
2006	Comedy Lab	Jane	Episode: "FM"
2006–2011	Lead Balloon	Mel	Series 1–4; 26 episodes
2007	Party Animals	Jo Porter	8 episodes
2007	Britz	Joy	2-part television film
2007	Sold	Yvette Daniels	Episode #1.3
2008	Casualty	Monica Batchelor	Episode: "Before a Fall"
2008	Agatha Christie's Poirot	Maureen Summerhayes	Episode: "Mrs McGinty's Dead"
2008	No Heroics	Kim the Agent	Episode: "Monkey Gone to Heaven"
2008–2009	Moving Wallpaper	Nancy Weeks	Series 1 & 2; 18 episodes
2009	New Tricks	Susannah Morton	Episode: "The Truth Is Out There"
2010	On Expenses	House of Commons Counsel	Television film
2011	Land Girls	Diana Granville	Series 2; 5 episodes
2011	Doctor Who	Miranda Cleaves	Episodes: "The Rebel Flesh" & "The Almost People"
2011	DCI Banks	Dr. Elizabeth Waring	Episodes: "Friend of the Devil: Parts 1 & 2"
2012	Midsomer Murders	Diana DeQuetteville	Episode: "The Dark Rider"
2012	Hustle	Dr. Dana Deville	Episode: "Eat Yourself Slender"
2012	A Touch of Cloth	Clare Hawkchurch	Episodes: "The First Case: Parts 1 & 2"
2013	The Other Child	DI Valerie Almond	2 episodes
2013	Jo	Pauline Langlois	Mini-series; episode: "Notre Dame"
2013	Heading Out	Sabine	Episode #1.3
2013	Law & Order: UK	Lydia Smythson	Episode: "Dependent"
2013–2015	Downton Abbey	Phyllis Baxter	Series 4–6; 23 episodes
2014	Jonathan Creek	Sharon	Episode: "The Letters of Septimus Noone"
2015	Vera	Gloria Edwards	Episode: "Shadows in the Sky"
2015–2017	Uncle	Teresa	Series 2 & 3; 5 episodes
2016	Mid Morning Matters with Alan Partridge	Hayley	Episode: "Grundy + Snow"
2017	Silent Witness	Dr. Eva Vasquez	Episodes: "Awakening: Parts 1 & 2"
2017	W1A	Tasmin Howard	Episode #3.5
2017–2020	The Worst Witch	Miss Hardbroom	Series 1–4; 53 episodes
2018	Strangers	Rachel Hargreaves	6 episodes
2022	The Good Karma Hospital	Frankie Martin	Series 4; 4 episodes
2022	Safe Space	Lucy Leer	Episode #1.0
2023	The Chelsea Detective	Maria Swanson	Episode: "Golden Years"
2024	Van der Valk	Anki Bergen	Episode: "Hope in Amsterdam"
2026	Beyond Paradise	June Harris	Episode #4.2

=== Selected radio ===
Year	Title	Role
2008	Spending My Inheritance	Jo
2015	Ed Reardon's Week	Suzan

=== Theatre ===
Year	Title	Role	Theatre
1997	Twelfth Night	Viola	Royal Court Theatre
1998	Othello	Desdemona	National tour
1998	Threesome	Ruth	Old Red Lion Theatre
2002	Possible Worlds	Joyce	Tron Theatre
2004	Macbeth	Lady Macbeth	International tour
2005	Anna Karenina	Anna Arkadyevna Karenina	Royal Lyceum Theatre
2006	Mirandolina	Mirandolina	Royal Exchange Theatre
2019	Shipwreck	Jools / Donald J. Trump's Secretary	Almeida Theatre
