= The Worst Witch (film) =

1986 British television film

- VHS cover
- Based on: The Worst Witch by Jill Murphy
- Screenplay by: Mary Pleshette Willis
- Directed by: Robert W. Young
- Starring: Diana Rigg; Tim Curry; Charlotte Rae; Fairuza Balk
- Country of origin: United Kingdom
- Original language: English

Production
- Executive producer: Hilary Heath
- Producer: Colin Shindler
- Cinematography: Ian Hollands
- Editor: Andrew Denny
- Running time: 70 minutes
- Production company: Central

Original release
- Network: ITV
- Release: 1 November 1986

The Worst Witch is a 1986 British musical fantasy television film based on the first children's book in The Worst Witch series, written in 1974, by the English author Jill Murphy.

The film stars Fairuza Balk as Mildred Hubble, who is the "Worst Witch" at Miss Cackle's Academy for Witches. Charlotte Rae plays Miss Cackle, Diana Rigg stars as Miss Hardbroom, and Tim Curry plays the Grand Wizard who appears at Halloween. The opening and closing song, "Growing Up Isn't Easy", is performed by the English West End theatre star Bonnie Langford. Several television series and adaptations have aired for both ITV and the BBC between 1998 and 2020.

== Plot ==
The story revolves around Mildred Hubble, who is invariably the "Worst Witch" at Miss Cackle's Academy for Witches. Mildred causes many mishaps, including being late for school, making all of her classmates fall down, unintentionally turning herself and her friend Maud Warlock invisible, and transforming the class bully Ethel into a pig. The climax surrounds Miss Amelia Cackle's notorious evil twin sister, Agatha, plotting to take over the academy. Ultimately Agatha is foiled by Mildred, and Mildred establishes herself as the hero for the academy.

== Cast ==
- Fairuza Balk as Mildred Hubble
- Diana Rigg as Miss Constance Hardbroom
- Charlotte Rae as Miss Amelia Cackle/Agatha Cackle
- Tim Curry as Grand Wizard
- Sabina Franklyn as Miss Spellbinder
- Su Elliot as Delilah
- Danielle Batchelor as Maud Warlock
- Anna Kipling as Ethel Hallow
- Kate Buckley as Donna
- Leila Marr as Pixie Brown
- Liz May Brice as Zoe Chant-Vestry
- Katrina Heath as Sophie Hattrick
- Tara Stevenson as Gloria Hobgoblin
- Laura Heath as Misty Meadow
- Sophie Cook as Natalie Sinister
- Sophie Millett as Verity Sinister
- Julia J. Nagle as Bubble Toil
- Kathryn Lacey as Goodie Twocharm
- Nevena Kaley as Dawn Undercover
- Caroline Woolf as Julie Vanishing
- Amy Shindler as Spinner Webb
- Pui Fan Lee as Prefect

== Production ==
The film was shot at St Michael's College in Tenbury Wells, Worcestershire, England.

== Soundtrack ==
The film's opening and closing song "Growing Up Isn't Easy" was performed by the West End star Bonnie Langford and was composed by Charles Strouse with lyrics by Don Black. The pair also wrote "Anything Can Happen on Halloween". Denis King composed the film's score and wrote the song "My Little School".

== See also ==
- List of films about witchcraft
- List of films set around Halloween
