= Guising (disambiguation) =

Guising, guizing, a guiser or guizer may refer to:

- Guising, a Scottish and Irish tradition which is the origin of trick-or-treating
- Mummer, costume-wearing celebrant of medieval to early-modern times
- Guiser, an amateur actor in a mummers' play
- Guizer, member of an Up Helly Aa squad
- Guise dancing, Christmastide community mumming performed in Cornwall

== See also ==
- Guise (disambiguation)
- Disguise
- Disguise (disambiguation)
- Trick or treat (disambiguation)
