= List of The Worst Witch (1998 TV series) episodes =

The Worst Witch is a British ITV television series about a group of young witches at a Magic Academy. The series stars Georgina Sherrington and Felicity Jones, and is based on The Worst Witch books by Jill Murphy. It aired for a total of three series between 1998 and 2001 before being followed by Weirdsister College. Most episodes revolved around the school, following the adventures of Mildred and her friends. The series was later followed by The New Worst Witch, which ran for two series and chronicled the experiences of Mildred's younger cousin Hettie as she attended the school. The series was rebooted in 2017 as The Worst Witch, a co-production between CBBC, ZDF and Netflix.

== Series overview ==
| Series | Episodes | Originally released | |
| Series | Episodes | First released | Last released |
|---|---|---|---|
| 1 | 13 | 22 October 1998 | 28 January 1999 |
| 2 | 13 | 4 November 1999 | 3 February 2000 |
| 3 | 14 | 9 November 2000 | 26 January 2001 |

== Episodes ==
=== Series 1 (1998–1999) ===
| No. overall | No. in series | Title | Directed by | Written by | Original release date |
|---|---|---|---|---|---|
| 1 | 1 | "The Battle of the Broomsticks" | Andrew Morgan | Martin Riley | 22 October 1998 |
The strains of a school song can be heard echoing through the vaulted halls of a Gothic castle. For this is Miss Cackle's Academy for Witches. The young witches fly in on their broomsticks across the dark wooded slopes and over the school gates for the start of another year. The stern and staunch Deputy Head, Miss Hardbroom, is taking a register of the first years as they arrive. She is very pleased to see Ethel Hallow come flying in and make a perfect landing, but has to inform the Headmistress, Miss Cackle, that Mildred Hubble hasn't yet arrived. Mildred Hubble, an eager but awkward young girl, arrives breathless at the other side of the gate just as it shuts. Inside the courtyard, Miss Cackle is making a speech of welcome to the girls. At that moment Mildred, in full flight, rises up over the gates, swoops along the courtyard and crashes straight into the school dustbins, breaking her broomstick in half. Everyone has a laugh at her expense, but Maud Moonshine comes to her rescue, and Miss Hardbroom is clearly not impressed. The next few days are full of madness and mystery as Mildred comes to terms with all the rules and age-old traditions of Cackle's Academy. The first two weeks are devoted to broomstick flying, but Mildred is afraid of heights. She is warned that, though she may be a scholarship girl, if she doesn't pass her Broomstick Aptitude Test, Miss Cackle will be forced to ask her to leave. When the time comes, with a little bit of magic from somewhere unexpected, Mildred stays the course and manages to perform some extraordinary manoeuvres.
| 2 | 2 | "When We Feast at the Midnight Hour" | Andrew Morgan | Martin Riley | 29 October 1998 |
A few weeks into the term, and homesickness is taking its toll on the first years. Part of their problem is the food – liver in cold, greasy gravy, fish with gazing eyes and lumpy milk puddings. As a result, they have resorted to eating too many sweets. Miss Cackle decides that the only answer is to set an example by eating exactly the same food as the girls for a week. Meanwhile Mrs Tapioca, the school cook, comes to Mildred's rescue and invites her down to the kitchen to sample her fresh pasta and pizzas. Mildred spots an extraordinary contraption, which Frank Blossom has created for catching mice. She also notices an interesting cupboard, which Mrs Tapioca tells her is where the staff keep their own food. Mildred has an idea and later she suggests to the others that they have a midnight feast. Miss Cackle takes a class in simple shape-changing, and their hats are magicked into an amusing range of headgear. She also tells them the legend of Sir Walter's Wet Week – centuries ago, Baron Overblow refused to give shelter to Sir Walter one wild and stormy night and left him in the rain to die. As a result, every year it rains for a whole week, and on the last night there is a big storm, during which Sir Walter walks the corridors looking for revenge. Ethel and Drusilla hatch a plan to scare Mildred and her friends by pretending to be the ghost of Sir Walter, but the tables are turned and they get more than they bargained for – thanks to Miss Cackle and Frank's amazing cheese protector. Miss Cackle has proved her point over the school food, but agrees to change the rules and declares Saturdays to be pizza days.
| 3 | 3 | "A Pig In a Poke" | Andrew Morgan | Martin Riley | 5 November 1998 |
It is time for the presentation of the kittens. Mildred nearly doesn't get one at all, and when she does there are no black ones left, so she has to make do with a tabby. Meanwhile, Frank is looking after his nephew Charlie for a few days and brings him to the school. Charlie is fascinated by the girls, but finds it hard to believe that they are really witches. When Ethel brags about her family portraits that adorn the walls, Charlie insults her lineage. When Tabby can't even manage to cling onto Mildred's broom, Ethel lays into her about how hopeless she is. Mildred has been looking up spells in the library and, pushed too far, tries to turn Ethel into a frog – only to find a pig in front of her. The pig trots off, and the chase is on to catch it and turn it back into Ethel before Miss Hardbroom discovers what has happened. Charlie gets mixed up in all this by memorizing a simple reversing spell, which comes in handy when Mildred turns Ethel into the pig. When Frank brings Ethel to Ted's pig farm, Mildred and Charlie must rescue her before the farmer takes them to the market. Charlie manages to save the day, though not before the pig becomes a duck and Charlie becomes a donkey.
| 4 | 4 | "A Mean Hallowe'en" | Andrew Morgan | Martin Riley | 12 November 1998 |
All of Mildred's attempts to revise her potion notes fail, and when Miss Hardbroom gives them the test of making a laughter potion, Mildred and Maud accidentally create an invisibility potion. Miss Hardbroom sends them to Miss Cackle's office, where Mildred is severely reprimanded, and called the worst witch. Mildred is determined not to get into any more trouble, but Halloween is approaching, and Mildred's class is chosen to put on a flying display. In a rare show of democracy, Miss Hardbroom draws the parts out of a cauldron, and Mildred is chosen to play the main character. She will have to perform fancy broomstick-flying moves. Miss Hardbroom insists that Mildred's broom, stuck together with parcel tape, be replaced with Ethel's. Ethel is still furious about Mildred turning her into a pig, and whispers a few words to the broomstick. The Chief Wizard, Egbert Hellibore, attends the Halloween celebration. He expects a fine presentation, in the tradition of Cackle's Academy. All goes well until Ethel's broom starts behaving in a most unorthodox way and Mildred crashes into Chief Wizard Hellibore. The ceremony is ruined and Mildred is in deep disgrace, so she decides to run away.
| 5 | 5 | "Double, Double, Toil and Trouble" | Andrew Morgan | Martin Riley | 19 November 1998 |
A distressed Mildred runs off with Tabby, and stopping to rest in the valley below she comes upon a group of witches. They are planning to take over Cackle's Academy by turning everyone into frogs while they are asleep. Mildred casts self-defense spell on the witches but it doesn't stick, so they cast the same spell on her and leave her stuck in the ground. Miss Drill, who has decided to take a ride in the forest, comes to Mildred's rescue. Back at the school, the evil witches have turned Miss Cackle into a frog. Mildred and Maud, who have decided to become friends again under the circumstances, team up to trap the witches. Maud will create a diversion while Mildred will try to re-create the wrong spell, "in exactly the right way". They end up in the potion lab where Mildred casts the spell on the witches, shrinks them, and puts them in a box. Miss Cackle is furious when she discovers her jealous twin sister Agatha in the bunch, and demands that they concede defeat and take a no-retaliation oath according to the Witches Code. They reluctantly agree, and are restored to their original sizes. Miss Cackle is so pleased with Mildred for coming to the rescue of the Academy that she decides to forget all about the celebration foul-ups.
| 6 | 6 | "Monkey Business" | Stefan Pleszczynski | Garry Lyons | 26 November 1998 |
A new term and Mildred arrives back at school with trepidation. Thinking that some extra responsibility might do her some good, Miss Cackle asks Mildred to look after a new first year, Enid Nightshade. On the surface the new girl seems rather quiet and dull. Mildred throws herself wholeheartedly into watching Enid, and Maud feels left out. Meanwhile, Mr Blossom has waged a war against a wayward fungus that has spread all over the school. One night, as he is skulking about the halls pulverizing it, he sees a monkey in Enid's bedroom. Enid's true character is discovered while the girls are rehearsing for a play with Miss Drill – when Enid has had enough of Ethel's snootiness, she unties the rope holding the scenery upright, which falls on Ethel's head and knocks her out. She and Mildred are punished by being made to scrub the floors, a task of which Enid quickly tires. She runs off leaving Mildred alone with the scrub-brush. Mildred goes looking for Enid, and when she opens the door to her room, the monkey escapes. Mildred thinks she'll do Enid a good turn and chases it on her broomstick, which ends in disaster. Miss Hardbroom thinks the monkey is Ethel, but in fact it is Enid's cat, which she turned into a monkey for fun.
| 7 | 7 | "Miss Cackle's Birthday Surprise" | Stefan Pleszczynski | Garry Lyons | 3 December 1998 |
Miss Cackle's birthday is a day of indescribable boredom where the girls are all expected to sing, recite or chant for her in the Great Hall. Maud is getting special coaching for her chanting and Ethel is playing solo violin. The first years are taken on a cross-country run by Miss Drill, during which Enid decides to cheat and transport her and Mildred further forward into the race by magic. However, the spell goes wrong and Mildred ends up being transported back to the school, where she finds herself hanging from the chandelier in the Great Hall where some of the girls are rehearsing for Miss Cackle's celebration. Mildred subsequently drops from the chandelier and falls on Ethel, breaking her violin. She then gets put on probation by Miss Cackle, and if she does one tiny thing wrong, Mildred will not be allowed on the upcoming school trip over half-term. On the morning of the birthday celebrations, Enid, determined not to sit through the whole interminable performance, drags a reluctant Mildred into a store cupboard. Ethel spots them and locks the door on them. Inside the locked cupboard Mildred is in despair, thinking she'll be expelled, but then they spot an arch high up on one wall. They then find a broken broomstick that they temporarily repair with Enid's sash and very shakily they manage to take off. At Miss Cackle's celebration, the proceedings are in full swing when suddenly Mildred and Enid fly out through an archway at the top of the hall. Maud, thinking quickly, introduces them as the surprise item – a double display on solo broomstick. Despite their clownish acrobatics, Miss Cackle takes it kindly and Mildred is permitted to go on the school trip over half-term.
| 8 | 8 | "The Great Outdoors" | Stefan Pleszczynski | Martin Riley | 10 December 1998 |
It is half-term, and the girls are off on a "strictly no magic" camping trip with Miss Drill and Miss Hardbroom. Mildred soon breaks this rule, after she attempts to lighten their loads. After a lot muttering and moaning, the group arrive at their destination, only to find they have been double-booked with a team of Canadian boy scouts. Much to Miss Hardbroom's displeasure, the two groups decide to "embrace the democracy of the great outdoors" and share the campsite. The girls are getting along extremely well with the boys and Miss Drill is getting on even better with their team leader, Serge Dubois. Miss Hardbroom is convinced it will all end in disaster and resolves to have nothing more to do with the trip. The next day, Miss Drill and Serge decide to send the group on a treasure quest. Ethel and Drusilla are on one team, and Mildred is on the other. Ethel lets her competitiveness get the better of her when the other team gets to the treasure map before her. She magics a few natural phenomenas, and when Mildred retaliates, things get completely out of hand. With a heavy blizzard raging, Miss Drill suspects magic and begs Miss Hardbroom to stop the weather, but it takes a bit of convincing. When Miss Hardbroom finally quells the roaring winds, everybody comes together in a celebration of tea and marshmallows.
| 9 | 9 | "The Heat is On" | Andrew Morgan | Martin Riley | 17 December 1998 |
A heat wave has struck Cackle's Academy and Miss Bat has let the girls practice their Chanting outside. The girls use it as an opportunity to sunbathe on the broomshed roof, until Miss Hardbroom catches them and punishes them by making them clear out the locker room. Meanwhile Miss Hardbroom is fed up with Miss Bat's irresponsible attitude to teaching and her habit of eating flowers. A row subsequently develops ending with Miss Bat locking herself in the staffroom cupboard until further notice. Miss Cackle magics the girls a refreshing summer drink, and then sets them a task of re-creating the drink by natural means only. For once Ethel and Drusilla team up with Mildred and her friends. After several unsuccessful attempts to make the drink using natural products, Mildred asks Miss Bat for help, saying that she believes flowers are the key ingredient to the drink. While out collecting flowers, Mildred and Drusilla have a fight and end up in the river, causing Miss Hardbroom to separate them and make the challenge a competition. Mildred and her friends manage to successfully re-create Cackle's magic drink using flowers, while Ethel cheats by using a potion. Ethel then sabotages Mildred's drink by spiking it with chilli sauce, but causes further chaos when her magic drink results in a severe case of the Foster's effect, sending Miss Cackle, Miss Hardbroom and Miss Bat shooting through the Great Hall ceiling when they taste it.
| 10 | 10 | "Sorcery and Chips" | Stefan Pleszczynski | Martin Riley | 7 January 1999 |
Mildred is looking after 'Bonzo', who is Ruby's cyberpet. During a potion lesson to make the elixir of life, Mildred drops Bonzo into her potion, which overflows onto the desk and floorboads. They then come to life as trees and destroy the potion laboratory, after which Bonzo goes missing. Miss Cackle seizes the opportunity for a complete modernization of the laboratory and decides to invite the Chair of the School Governors (who happens to be Mr Hallow, Ethel's father) to inspect the damage and hopefully pay to re-equip the laboratory. Mr Hallow arrives at the academy and convinces the teachers to set up a computer system. Meanwhile, Bonzo makes his return, but he has been affected by magic as a result of the potion lab's destruction. Bonzo connects up to the computer system and uses it to hypnotize everyone, to try to help him enslave the world when the system is connected to the Internet. Mildred becomes concerned that her friends are becoming zombies at the mercy of the computers. Fenella and Griselda draw her attention to an old fairy book and tell her the story of the Snow Queen who places a splinter of glass in Kay's heart, which puts him under her power. The comparison is obvious and Mildred looks for a spell that could undo the attention of the computers. Mildred's enchantment works on Ruby and Miss Hardbroom and, in the nick of time, Miss Hardbroom saves the day.
| 11 | 11 | "Let Them Eat Cake" | Stefan Pleszczynski | Martin Riley & Jeremy Swan | 14 January 1999 |
After being foiled in a plot to steal sweets from Mildred and her friends, Ethel decides to lure them to an out-of-bounds tearoom in the woods to get even. The girls meet a nature-loving businessman named Sam, who has trouble standing up to his overbearing boss, Percy Slyce. Meanwhile, Miss Cackle is already at the tearoom. Unseen by her, the girls settle down at a table where they overhear Slyce's plan to trick the tearoom's owner, Mrs Cosie, into selling so that a toxic incinerator can be built on the site. This would make life unbearable for the inhabitants of Miss Cackle's, not to mention the wildlife. Mildred and the others hatch a plan to prevent Mrs Cosie from signing the tearooms away.
| 12 | 12 | "Sweet Talking Guys" | Andrew Morgan | Martin Riley | 21 January 1999 |
The Grand Wizard comes to give a lecture to the young witches on his travels. In the second part of his lecture he has a talking competition between two of his apprentice wizards (Baz and Gaz) and two Cackle's academy witches on 'Are Wizards better than witches'. The wizards competing feel that they cannot win without resorting to cheating so they create a potion that will make them speak eloquently. The competition takes place with both sides speaking well (wizard's cheating). Mildred discovers about it by talking to Merlin (who responds with gestures), another apprentice wizard who is bullied by Baz and Gaz. She takes some and enters the school hall, in the second half of the competition, where the competition is taking place and reveals what the 'cough spray' that they have been taking is. Miss. Hardbroom checks the contents of the cough spray and announces that it is indeed a potion. The wizards lose the competition for cheating and the Cackle's academy witches win.
| 13 | 13 | "A Bolt from the Blue" | Andrew Morgan | Garry Lyons | 28 January 1999 |
It is nearly the end of the year for the student witches, and Mildred's incantations still don't seem to work as well as intended. To cure a case of hay fever brought on by one of Mildred's errors, the other teachers give Miss Cackle what they assume to be a remedy potion, but which is in fact a mislabelled experiment of Miss Hardbroom's. The other teachers make no mention of the mishap, even when Miss Cackle's behaviour takes a turn for the malicious, especially towards Mildred. She announces to the staff that she is going to expel her, which is a shocking fate, even for the worst witch. It is Mildred and company, however, who realise that it is not Miss Cackle, but her evil twin sister Agatha back to cause more trouble. The girls track down the real Miss Cackle to the store cupboard in which Mildred and Enid were once trapped, but they are discovered by Agatha's two wicked cronies, Coldstone and Bindweed, and time is ticking away to midday on the last day of term. The final confrontation takes place in front of everybody and Mildred saves the day, for which she earns a raise in her final grade from C-- to A+.

=== Series 2 (1999–2000) ===
| No. overall | No. in series | Title | Directed by | Written by | Original release date |
|---|---|---|---|---|---|
| 14 | 1 | "Old Hats and New Brooms" | Andrew Morgan | Martin Riley | 4 November 1999 |
Mildred arrives for her second year at Cackle's in a positive mood. There is a new intake of young would-be witches one of whom, Sybil, seems particularly wimpy. Mildred, in an attempt to be kind to Sybil, only seems to make matters worse and is inevitably blamed for Sybil's tears. Meanwhile, an argument is going on in the staff room between Miss Bat and Miss Drill about who is to be the second year class tutor, as the usual tutor Miss Gimlet has decided not to return. Miss Cackle suggests that they share responsibility while she makes up her mind. This leads to rivalry and mischief between the two factions of Class Two – those for Miss Bat and those for Miss Drill. Ethel and Drusilla enlist the help of Sybil and Clarice in their scheme to get Mildred and her gang in trouble. When Mildred makes a surprise discovery – that Sybil is Ethel's younger sister – the game is up. Neither Miss Bat nor Miss Drill make the grade as Year Two Class Tutor and Miss Hardbroom takes over once again.
| 15 | 2 | "Alarms and Diversions" | Andrew Morgan | Garry Lyons | 11 November 1999 |
Miss Cackle decides it is time to upgrade the school's alarm system, and Mr Blossom has concocted a wonderful contraption with levers and pulleys all around the school. It is not wholly reliable and inevitable false alarms ensue. Meanwhile, the girls are learning finger sparks to enhance the effect of spells with Miss Hardbroom. Sybil fails her broomstick flying test and Mildred tries to make her feel more comfortable, but she always seems to say the wrong thing. Things work themselves out though, when there is a genuine emergency in the school – created by Ethel and Drusilla – Mildred rises to the occasion, helped by her use of an overactive spell. She manages to save Sybil from a perilous situation and is awarded Cackle's Academy Medal for bravery.
| 16 | 3 | "It's a Frog's Life" | John Smith | Garry Lyons | 18 November 1999 |
Ethel thinks it's Mildred's fault that Sybil is always following her around, so when things go too far during a lesson of broomstick flying, Ethel vows to get her own back. When Tabby falls off Mildred's broomstick, she is sent to her room with strict orders to make sure that the cat learns to properly sit on the broomstick. Frustrated, Mildred decides to take a nap, and when she awakes, she discovers that she's been turned into a frog. She escapes to find help but instead, Miss Hardbroom scoops her up and puts her in her handbag. Mildred thinks this is all Miss Hardbroom's doing, when she is unceremoniously dumped into a jar. Life as a frog is far from easy, so Mildred is greatly relieved when she manages to escape to the safety of the school pond. There she meets another frog – a wizard who has been enchanted so long ago that he can't even remember his own name. Mildred promises to get help as soon as she's restored to her old self. With a lot of effort, Mildred gets back to the school, where the others discover what has happened. When Ethel turns her back, she discovers it wasn't Miss Hardbroom that turned her into a frog.
| 17 | 4 | "Crumpets for Tea" | John Smith | Garry Lyons | 25 November 1999 |
Chief Wizard Hellibore is to give a master class in magic to the girls of Cackle's Academy. This is an ideal opportunity for Mildred to enlist his help to change her newfound frog friend back to his old self, but Mildred has been banished to her room and, as punishment, forbidden to attend the master class. She manages to lure Drusilla to her room and goes to the class in her place. Ethel, who has also been banished from the class, exposes Mildred. It looks as though Mildred is in trouble again, especially when Hellibore recognises her as the girl who crashed into him last Halloween. Determined to keep her promise she reveals the wizard-frog who she has been hiding under her cloak, and persuades The Chief Wizard to change him back. Lo and behold, the two Wizards are old friends from long ago and there is general rejoicing all around.
| 18 | 5 | "The Inspector Calls" | John Smith | Garry Lyons | 2 December 1999 |
Panic spreads amongst the teachers of Cackle's Academy: they are going to have a visit from the Witch School Inspectorate, OFWITCH. The particular individual appointed to inspect Cackle's Academy is none other than Mistress Hecate Broomhead, a tyrant of the first order and, as it happens, Miss Hardbroom's personal tutor from witch training college. An emergency plan of action is drawn up and, in order to prevent any unforeseen disasters, Mildred is banished to her room and her bats are confiscated. Sybil, who has been desperately trying to do all she can do to impress Mildred, is somewhat uneasy when Fenella and Griselda tell her where the bats are hidden. The inspection is not a success – Mistress Broomhead is bent on closing down the school, particularly when she discovers the subterfuge over Mildred. Sybil comes into her own and casts a spell on Broomhead, which has such a drastic effect that she is forced to change her mind. Once again, the school is saved from closure.
| 19 | 6 | "Animal Magic" | John Smith | Martin Riley | 9 December 1999 |
It is the start of the summer term and there's a blizzard raging outside Cackle's Academy. The girls are all desperately trying to stay warm and Miss Drill tries to get the blood flowing by having the girls jog around the school. Meanwhile, Mrs Tapioca is having problems with a rat in the kitchen. Amidst all the chaos, who should arrive seeking shelter from the weather, but Chief Wizard Hellibore, Algernon Rowan-Webb and three wizard apprentices Baz, Gaz and Merlin. Algernon is in a particularly mischievous mood and in order to cheer everybody up, pronounces the day to be an upside-down day. Everything is turned on its head; teachers and pupils change places and there are games instead of lessons. Fenella and Griselda teach a Potions class, while the others play games in the Great Hall. The grand finale of the day is a shape-changing competition between The Chief Wizard and Algernon, but things go terribly wrong when Algernon changes himself into a mouse and is threatened by The Chief Wizard in the shape of an owl. He escapes to the kitchen where he is in equal danger from Mrs Tapioca's cat. Mildred and Merlin save the day and as a "thank you", Algernon invites Mildred and her class to his riverside retreat where he has decided to retire.
| 20 | 7 | "Carried Away" | Andrew Morgan | Martin Riley | 16 December 1999 |
It is half-term, and Mildred and her friends set off to visit Algernon at his riverside retreat. Mildred has been told to leave her cat Tabby behind, but when no one is looking she manages to smuggle him away with her. Much to Mildred's delight, she discovers that Algernon has taken on Merlin as his apprentice. She lets him into the secret about Tabby and together they hide him in the cabin of a small boat, and secretly supply him with food. Miss Hardbroom, while taking a walk on the beach, hears a cat mewing and goes to investigate. She slips on a kipper and is knocked unconscious. Meanwhile, Ethel and Drusilla have become suspicious of Mildred and after discovering the boat with Tabby on board, they untie the rope and send the boat down river towards the rapids, completely unaware that Miss Hardbroom is on board.
| 21 | 8 | "The Dragon's Hoard" | Andrew Morgan | Martin Riley | 23 December 1999 |
Mildred rescues Miss Hardbroom and Tabby from plunging to their death down the rapids, but Miss Hardbroom is still unconscious and the boat becomes wedged on some rocks. Meanwhile, Merlin has accidentally freed a Dragon Lord free from his captivity in a cave by the river. The Dragon Lord forces Merlin to take him to Algernon's riverside retreat, where he tells everyone that the house is his. He claims that Algernon, whom he has mistaken for the long-dead Wizard, Mandrake, had stolen the house from him, along with his treasure. He's been left in the cave for so long that he has lost track of time. The Dragon Lord wants his home back and his stolen treasure, or he will imprison everyone in the cave for all eternity. Cackle, Algernon, Ethel, Enid, Ruby and Jadu are in grave danger until Maud and Drusilla escape from the riverside retreat and rescue Mildred. They return with the lost treasure, which was hidden on the rocks, and a magic amulet Mildred found inside it. Mildred faces up to the Dragon Lord and defeats him with the amulet. Even Miss Hardbroom, when she has regained consciousness, finds it impossible to be too severe on Mildred and allows her to keep Tabby.
| 22 | 9 | "The Genius of the Lamp" | Stefan Pleszczynski | Martin Riley | 6 January 2000 |
Sybil, Clarice and the other first years are left with Miss Bat and Miss Drill while the rest of the school is away on a trip. The two teachers see this as an opportunity to put all their favourite educational ideas into practice. As a result, there is a lot of P.E. and chanting for the girls. In the staff room, Miss Drill and Miss Bat are competing for Miss Cackle's vacant chair and the authority it confirms. The first years however, are fed up with P.E. and chanting, so Miss Bat and Miss Drill persuade Mrs Semolina to teach a cooking lesson. This ends in disaster when Sybil and Clarice use the opportunity to lace the salad dressing with a dancing potion. Soon, the staff is helplessly and wildly tangoing around the staff room. Sybil and Clarice pretend to make amends for this catastrophe by inventing a magical everlasting light to replace the candles, but they are really inventing a magic lamp in an attempt to make all of Sybil's wishes come true. The side-effects are disastrous, and the castle is nearly destroyed – until Clarice has an inspiration.
| 23 | 10 | "Up in the Air" | Stefan Pleszczynski | Garry Lyons | 13 January 2000 |
Mr Blossom's nephew Charlie has arrived for another weekend visit to Cackle's. He is fed up with his own school and jealous of the fun the girls seem to have at the Academy, so he persuades his uncle to ask if he can become a pupil at the Academy. The Academy is busy planning celebrations for the commemoration day of their founder, Great, Great, Great Granny Cackle. Miss Drill seems sympathetic to Charlie's request but Miss Hardbroom is dead set against it, despite Miss Cackle wondering if it might not be time for the Academy to go coed. In the end, Cackle decides that Miss Hardbroom should give Charlie one of her tests as a way of proving his worth. She gives Charlie a math test, and as he's failing miserably, Mildred comes to his rescue with a spell. It gets out of control and has magic numbers flying everywhere. Charlie's hopes are dashed until Fenella and Griselda turn up with a book, which states that every boy who turns up at the founder's day feast must be automatically accepted into the Academy. To keep him from having to go home before then, Enid decides to give him a magical case of the flu. This turns out terribly for Charlie, and Miss Bat's herbal cure makes him feel even worse. Miss Hardbroom then catches them in the act and announces that she knew what they were doing all along. Charlie however, doesn't think it's much fun to be a witch anymore, although he enjoys being allowed to stay for the Founder's Supper.
| 24 | 11 | "Fair Is Foul & Fouls Are Fair" | Stefan Pleszczynski | David Finley | 20 January 2000 |
The girls are getting bored and restless, and they can't wait for the term to end. Miss Drill introduces the girls to basketball and arranges a friendly match with the Hevversham Hevvies from her previous school. Mr Blossom is given the job of turning the Great Hall into a basketball court, which he does with enthusiasm. The Hevvies, however, led by the imperious Miss Pike, are tough and ruthless and during the basketball game, walk all over Cackle's Academy. All the teachers and most of the school are watching the humiliation of their team. Up until now, Mildred and Ethel have been enemies, but now they must put their differences aside and show that they have all the necessary magic to produce a win from thin air.
| 25 | 12 | "Green Fingers and Thumbs" | Stefan Pleszczynski | Clive Endersby | 27 January 2000 |
Mildred's chances of passing the upcoming potion exam look slim, as Ethel and Drusilla conspire to get her thrown out of Cackle's. Meanwhile, Mr Blossom's chances of winning the local gardening competition are sabotaged by his rival, Terry Root. Root has persuaded Miss Cackle (with a certain amount of blackmail concerning the girls' behaviour in the village) to allow the gardening competition to take place in the Academy Courtyard. When Mr Blossom's greenhouse is trashed and his marrows are destroyed, Miss Hardbroom, who suspects Mildred and her friends, forbids the girls to have anything more to do with gardening – after they have cleared up the mess of course. Mildred and Maud find one marrow untouched and decide a growing potion will help Mr Blossom win the competition. Ethel and Drusilla see this as a chance to get Mildred in big trouble with Miss Hardbroom. The growing potion turns out to be the right answer for both Mildred and Mr Blossom, while Ethel's plans blow up in everybody's face.
| 26 | 13 | "The Millennium Bug" | Stefan Pleszczynski | Martin Riley | 3 February 2000 |
The surprise guest for Cackle's Millennium celebrations is pop star and former pupil, Amanda Honeydew. Miss Bat is preparing a performance of one of the Spell Girls' songs with Fenella, Griselda, Sybil and Clarice. The second years are planning some dramatic episodes from the Castle's history. Sybil, who is meant to be playing the clarinet, loses confidence and walks out on Miss Bat's band. Mildred and her friends are elbowed out of their drama slot by Ethel and Drusilla, who want to do the storming of the Castle by Major Barebones in 1644. Mildred and her friends decide to do their own Living Waxwork of Horrors in the dungeons, but then a real horror-story breaks. It transpires that Mr Hallow, Ethel's father and Chair of the School of Governors, is planning to sell the Castle to Amanda and build an ultra-modern school with the proceeds. Miss Hardbroom resigns in protest, but, after a surprisingly frank and tender meeting with Mildred in the dungeons, Mildred plots and schemes with her friends and her enemies to put off Amanda and save the old Castle from being turned into a theme park. Sybil has found the confidence to improvise on the clarinet but the words they sing to the Spell Girls' song is designed to unsettle Amanda – and the Living Waxwork in the dungeon is designed to terrify the wits out of her.

=== Series 3 (2000–2001) ===
| No. overall | No. in series | Title | Directed by | Written by | Original release date |
|---|---|---|---|---|---|
| 27 | 1 | "Secret Society" | Andrew Morgan | Garry Lyons | 9 November 2000 |
The girls are now in their third year at Cackle's Academy. Miss Bat has left and Miss Crotchet is the new Chanting teacher. Miss Drill is fed up of Miss Hardbroom treating her like one of the pupils and threatens to resign. Miss Cackle suggests that Mildred and her friends should join the Cauldron Club as something for them to do in their spare time, but the club is run by Ethel Hallow, who makes sure that Mildred fails the initiation test. Fenella and Griselda then show Mildred and her friends a secret room under the library, and they decide to form a club of their own called the Dangerous Old Book Society (DOBS). At first they do it in secret, until they are discovered by Ethel who alerts Miss Hardbroom. Miss Cackle decides to allow the girls to keep DOBS up and running, provided it is supervised by a teacher, which Miss Drill volunteers for.
| 28 | 2 | "An Unforgettable Experience" | Andrew Morgan | Garry Lyons | 16 November 2000 |
Mildred and Maud are sent on work experience to Cosie's cafe, which they are looking forward to, until they discover that Ethel and Drusilla are also doing work experience there. Mrs Cosie leaves the girls in charge of the cafe while she goes to the doctor's, and Ethel takes the opportunity to transform the cafe from an old-fashioned tea shop into a modern French Patisserie. All seems to go well until the Grand Wizard arrives with Baz and Gaz and demands a traditional English tea. Meanwhile the rest of the Third Years are taking part in an assault course through forest led by Miss Drill. Ruby and Jadu decide to bunk off and visit Mildred and Maud at Cosie's, and arrive to discover chaos has developed with the between the angry customers and girls. The girls are having a food fight in the kitchen with the wizards, and the cafe is full of angry Japanese tourists demanding a traditional English tea. Little do the girls know that Miss Cackle and Miss Hardbroom are on their way to the cafe to check on their progress. Mrs Cosie returns and orders everything to be put right, which the girls do just in time for Miss Cackle and Miss Hardbroom's arrival.
| 29 | 3 | "Which Witch is Which?" | Alex Kirby | Clive Endersby | 23 November 2000 |
Fenella and Griselda have to research the famous battle of Lucy Fairweather and Harriet Hogweed for their history project. After failing to find any useful information, they wish they could go back in time and view the battle for themselves. When Ruby mentions that it might be possible to do so, she modifies a pinball machine into a time-traveller. To get the girls into trouble, Ethel, Drusilla, Sybil and Clarice swap a wire in the pinball machine. This causes the machine to bring Lucy Fairweather and Harriet Hogweed forward in time rather than sending the girls back. The enemy witches continue their historic battle inside the school, both claiming to be Lucy Fairweather, the good witch. As Miss Cackle evacuates the Academy, Mildred asks Miss Hardbroom for help, claiming that she has a plan to discover which is the real Lucy Fairweather. In the presence of Fairweather and Hogweed, Miss Hardbroom states that the girls who brought the witches forward in time must be punished by being turned into toads. One of the witches then steps forward to protect the girls, proving that she is a good-hearted witch and therefore the real Lucy Fairweather. Together Lucy and Miss Hardbroom defeat Harriet Hogweed and the girls then send Lucy back to her own time, having won her battle.
| 30 | 4 | "The Witchy Hour" | Alex Kirby | Martin Riley | 30 November 2000 |
Cackle's Academy is chosen to take part in a quiz show on local radio show 'The Witchy Hour', hosted by DJ Icy Stevens, against the dreaded Pentangle's Academy. While Miss Cackle thinks it will be good for the Academy, Miss Hardbroom refuses to have anything to do with it. One of Pentangle's star players, Deirdre Swoop, is injured after a magic fight with Enid, and Mildred is ordered to stand in for her and play against Cackle's in the quiz, much to the disgust of her friends. Miss Pentangle offers Mildred a permanent transfer to her Academy if she does well in the quiz. Mildred's photographic memory is paying off for Pentangle's, and they look set to win, until Ethel intervenes. She attempts to turn Mildred into a frog, but accidentally hits Icy Stevens while still live on air. Miss Hardbroom then steps in to present the final round and saves the Academy from humiliation, declaring the quiz a draw.
| 31 | 5 | "Learning the Hard Way" | Alex Kirby | Martin Riley | 7 December 2000 |
Gabrielle Gribble, a student teacher from Weirdsister College, comes to the Academy for teaching practice. She is given the task of taking the Third Year potions class, but she is immediately thrown in at the deep end by Miss Hardbroom, who makes the Third Years out to be wild, uncontrollable rebels. Gabrielle responds by teaching incredibly strictly, getting off on the wrong foot with the Third Years, who plan revenge against her. She particularly singles out Enid, who she believes is Mildred, after being warned about her by Miss Hardbroom. The Third Years have their revenge by making her believe they have been turned into trees forever, causing her to break down and end up in tears. It is then revealed that Gabrielle is Miss Cackle's niece, but Miss Hardbroom insists that she should be treated like any other student teacher and plans to test the Third Years on what they have learnt with Gabrielle. The girls and Gabrielle work throughout the night, and she successfully shows Mildred how to turn herself into ice. Apart from a small unsuccessful sabotage attempt from Ethel, Gabrielle's review is successful.
| 32 | 6 | "The Hair Witch Project" | Alex Kirby | Garry Lyons | 14 December 2000 |
It is time for the dreaded Third Year Witch Project. Ethel makes a miniature broomstick to carry objects and messages, but is struggling to control it when in flight. Mildred and Ruby develop a summoning spell to find lost objects. Enid is trying to make a potion that restores the flavour to used bubble gum, but is ordered to abandon it when the gum floats across the school and bursts all over Miss Drill. After a fall out with her friends, Enid teams up with Drusilla to make a spell to change hairstyles instantly, but accidentally turns Miss Hardbroom into a goth during testing. After this, Ethel and Mildred's group agree to share research to solve each other's testing problems. During the demonstration ceremony in the Great Hall, Ethel's mini broom once again goes out of control, and Mildred tests her summoning spell on it. It then proceeds to attack her, until Enid transforms Mildred into a goth so it doesn't recognise her. Enid and Drusilla are awarded the Bullfrog Prize for producing a useful and injury-preventing project.
| 33 | 7 | "Just Like Clockwork" | Alex Kirby | Garry Lyons | 21 December 2000 |
When Miss Cackle has to leave the school to visit her sick aunt, Mr Hallow brings in a temporary Headmistress to take her place. The replacement is none other than Mistress Hecate Broomhead, the dreaded former OFWITCH inspector who tried to close down the Academy the previous year. Broomhead is a stickler for saving time, and orders large clocks to be put up around the school. She also makes Mildred wear an electronic tagging device so she can monitor where she is at all times. Meanwhile Ruby has been inventing a device that allows the person to be instantly transported from one place to another, and Mildred agrees to test it out as a way of avoiding Mistress Broomhead's monitoring, but device malfunctions and transports Mildred to random locations across the school. While outside, she overhears Mr Hallow planning to give Miss Cackle early retirement and make Mistress Broomhead the permanent Headmistress. Broomhead discovers Ruby's transportation device, and is highly impressed, believing it could save a great deal of time moving between places. She asks for a demonstration, but the device once again malfunctions, causing Broomhead to be teleported at lightning speed around the room, which she thoroughly enjoys. Miss Cackle then returns, having been sent for by the other teachers, and reverses all the changes Mistress Broomhead made.
| 34 | 8 | "Cinderella in Boots" | Andrew Morgan | Martin Riley | 24 December 2000 |
Cackle's Academy is staging a pantomime for the Christmas season, directed by Miss Crotchet. The pantomime is 'Cinderella', and is being staged in the Great Hall with the Grand Wizard in attendance. Mildred is playing Cinderella, but is suffering from stage fright just before the performance is due to start. Ethel wants to take over, stating that she knows all Mildred's lines, but Miss Crotchet won't allow it. Apprentice wizards Baz and Gaz are playing the Ugly Sisters, and Drusilla is cast as Prince Charming. Enid and Ethel are playing the cow and Miss Hardbroom, reluctantly, is the Fairy Godmother. Maud is playing Cinderella's wicked stepmother, and her character is dressed as Miss Hardbroom. Miss Drill and Charlie Blossom are the stage managers, but Charlie accidentally destroys Miss Hardbroom's pumpkin just before curtain-up. Ethel plans to force Mildred out of the show so she can take over as Cinderella, and asks for Drusilla's help. They give her some liquid from the magic generator to drink instead of water, causing her to become electrified. Miss Drill orders Ethel to take over as Cinderella, and Charlie finds some carrots to use instead of a pumpkin. Backstage, Charlie explains what Ethel and Drusilla did to Mildred, and Ruby reverses the effect before transforming Mildred into the Princess. When Drusilla refuses to co-operate, Enid magically swaps Charlie and Drusilla's clothes so Charlie can take over as the Prince. During the final ballroom scene, Charlie chooses Mildred over Ethel and the show is a success, much to the delight of the girls. Ethel, as always, is easily unimpressed.
| 35 | 9 | "Art Wars" | Stefan Pleszczynski | Martin Riley | 19 January 2001 |
It is Art Week at Cackle's Academy. To be more adventurous, Miss Cackle has invited Lynne Lamplighter, a local artist, to come to the school to mentor the girls with their artwork and teach more modern techniques. Predictably, Miss Hardbroom refuses to take part. Miss Cackle decides to turn the week into a competition and award a prize for the most impressive piece of artwork. Maud and Miss Cackle team up to paint a portrait, and Mildred offers to pose for them. Drusilla is attempting to make a clay sculpture, but Ethel refuses to get involved, stating that she thinks Art Week is a waste of time and Miss Lamplighter is not a real teacher. After Miss Cackle reveals to Ethel that Lamplighter is in fact a highly successful artist whose paintings sell for thousands, Ethel is determined to win the prize and have her work shown alongside Miss Lamplighter's. Realising the only real threat is Maud, Ethel orders Drusilla to start her sculpture again and make it better. Meanwhile, Mildred is lacking confidence and Miss Lamplighter tells her to go off by herself to draw something in private. Mildred soon discovers that she is a talented artist and her drawings are superb. Ethel spots one of Mildred's sketches and realises that Mildred is in fact the threat. Maud is jealous of Mildred's talent and the two have an argument, causing Mildred to tear up her drawing and retreat to her room. Ethel and Drusilla sneak to Mildred's room and transform her into a statue (Drusilla is noticeably uncomfortable with this) which they then enter as their artwork. Both Maud and Miss Lamplighter are spooked by its effect, and Maud realises that the statue is really Mildred. During the exhibition Maud turns Mildred back, and Miss Lamplighter awards the prize to Mildred for her talent with drawing.
| 36 | 10 | "Power Drill" | Stefan Pleszczynski | Garry Lyons | 22 January 2001 |
Miss Drill is preparing for her volleyball tournament as the girls and teachers return from the Witchcraft of the Year show. When Miss Cackle announces that the volleyball tournament is to be replaced by various witchcraft workshops, Miss Drill feels she is being left out because she is not a witch. To give Miss Drill a chance to fit in, Enid, Mildred and Maud mix a potion to give her witch powers temporarily. They then proceed to give Miss Drill the potion without her knowledge, with the intention that it will wear off after a few hours, but they accidentally give her an overdose of the potion, causing her powers to last for longer. Miss Cackle believes that Miss Drill's powers have developed naturally from being around witches all the time. Miss Hardbroom proceeds to test Miss Drill to determine if she really is a witch. After she passes the Broomstick Flying Test, Miss Cackle is forced to give Miss Drill an investiture and officially name her as a witch. Miss Drill then becomes selfish and unreasonable with her powers, and changes her name to Hilary Hemlock. Mildred, Maud and Enid decide they have to come clean about the potion. After Drill hears the truth, accidentally sends Enid flying into a wall and realises that in order to remain a witch she would have to continue taking the potion regularly (which could cause unknown side effects), she decides to return to normal and takes an antidote.
| 37 | 11 | "Better Dead Than Co-ed" | Andrew Morgan | Graham Mitchell | 23 January 2001 |
The Third Years are visiting Camelot College for Wizards, accompanied by Miss Cackle and Miss Hardbroom, to see how they would benefit from being taught in mixed-sex classes. Mildred and her friends are delighted to see Charlie Blossom, who is now an apprentice wizard at Camelot after not being granted a place at Cackle's the previous year, but Charlie is the new subject of Baz and Gaz's bullying. It is soon revealed that Grand Wizard Hellibore and Miss Cackle are planning to merge Cackle's with Camelot into a single, co-educational school for witches and wizards. Miss Hardbroom is furious and believes the idea is disastrous. The girls also don't like idea and plan to stop it from happening. The wizards plan to hold a late-night party in the basement, and Enid has an idea to use it to their advantage. She explains that Baz and Gaz both secretly fancy Mildred, and if Cackle and Hellibore could catch them getting 'too friendly' with her, they would realise that the merger is a bad idea. Enid spikes Baz and Gaz's drinks with a Truth Potion to make them show Mildred how they feel. The potion works, and both boys secretly send Mildred an invitation to the party. Mildred goes down to the basement armed with a walkie-takie, and Baz and Gaz start fighting over her. Ruby plants the other walkie-talkie outside the staffroom, alerting Cackle, Hardbroom and Hellibore. Hellibore sends Baz and Gaz to bed, but allows the party to go ahead under supervision. Nevertheless, the girls' plan works – Miss Cackle agrees that the merger is not such a good idea after all.
| 38 | 12 | "The Lost Chord" | Stefan Pleszczynski | Graham Mitchell | 24 January 2001 |
With the Third Years away at Camelot College, Cackle's is in the care of Miss Drill and Miss Crotchet. The girls return from the Inter-Schools Festival of Music and Chanting having won First Prize. Professor von Raffenburg, a world-famous conductor who was at the festival, comes to Cackle's as he is impressed with Miss Crotchet's musical compositions, but Sybil starts to doubt the Professor's motives when he appears unable to play any instrument or know anything about music. Von Raffenburg later tells Miss Crotchet of his ambition to find the 'Lost Chord' – a legendary chord which is said to have the power to grant wealth and happiness to anyone who hears it. The instruction of how to hear the Chord is written in an ancient book called 'Magicus Musicalis', but there is only one copy in existence. Miss Crotchet discovers the book is in the school library, but it contains forbidden spells and decides not to tell the Professor. Unbeknownst to Miss Crotchet, the Professor finds the book and persuades Fenella and Griselda to help him make a magic bell to hear the Lost Chord. Meanwhile, Sybil has worked out that the Professor is a conman and asks Clarice to help her tell Miss Crotchet, but Clarice is ill in bed with cotton wool in her ears. During assembly, the Professor presents the bell to Miss Crotchet. When she rings it, the Lost Chord takes effect, freezing everyone who hears it with a continuous sound. The Professor then sets about robbing the castle of its treasures. Clarice, not being able to hear the Chord, discovers the Professor robbing the girls' rooms. She frees Miss Crotchet, Miss Drill and the girls and they manage to stop Raffenburg before he escapes.
| 39 | 13 | "Unfairground" | Stefan Pleszczynski | Martin Riley | 25 January 2001 |
It is the end of the Third Year exams and the girls intend to celebrate. They sneak down to the local village to go to the fair, while Fenella and Griselda cover for them during registration, but they are caught out by Miss Hardbroom, who proceeds to punish Fenella and Griselda by making them scrub the corridors until they tell her where the girls have gone. Miss Cackle hides inside the girls' DOBS den under the library and waits for them to return. After hearing the girls being disrespectful to the Academy and herself, Miss Cackle snaps and demands an immediate crackdown on discipline and standards, much to Miss Hardbroom's delight. She issues a 'zero tolerance' order, not allowing the pupils any social time and confining them to the school building. Mildred and her friends decide to make a stand against the rules, and they have some unexpected support from Drusilla and Miss Drill. They write an underground newspaper containing their ideas and issue it around the school. They manage to gather the support of every girl in the school, and hold a secret meeting in the Great Hall followed by a magical rollercoaster ride. Later, Mildred and her friends are summoned to Miss Cackle's office, having been discovered as the source of the derogatory newspaper. As punishment for leading the rebellion, Miss Cackle suspends Mildred and Jadu from the Academy.
| 40 | 14 | "The Uninvited" | Stefan Pleszczynski | Martin Riley | 26 January 2001 |
Following the rebellion against Cackle's Academy, Mildred and Jadu have been suspended from the school. Until their parents come to collect them they are forced into isolation, copying out chapters of the 'Historica Magica'. Maud decides she will run for Head Girl to get Mildred and Jadu reinstated back in the school, but realises this won't be easy when she discovers that Ethel is also running. The girls have the idea that if Mildred had the opportunity to save the school from destruction, as she had done before, then it would count in her favour and Miss Cackle would reinstate them. They then decide to summon a mythical monster from a dangerous book called the 'Mytheocopia' with the intention that Mildred and Jadu would save the day, but the plan goes horribly wrong when they accidentally summon 'The Uninvited' - an evil witch who sets about putting everyone in the castle into a deep sleep. Meanwhile, Mildred has been sketching 'Prince Percy', a historical character from the book she is copying out, to help pass the time. She then discovers she has the ability to bring her drawings to life. After hearing about The Uninvited, Mildred brings her drawing of Prince Percy to life. Mildred, Jadu and Drusilla then use Prince Percy to wake everyone who has been put to sleep with a single kiss to the lips. After waking Miss Hardbroom, they proceed to the Great Hall where The Uninvited has just put Miss Crotchet to sleep. Miss Hardbroom battles the evil witch but is overpowered, and it is left to Mildred to save the day by returning The Uninvited to the Mytheocopia using her special ability. Later at the Head Girl election, on Maud's request, Miss Cackle makes Mildred Head Girl and Jadu Deputy Head Girl in recognition of their efforts in saving the Academy once again. Everyone, including Mildred, is happy except Ethel who is, as always, unimpressed of the outcome as the series ends. Note: This ending is similar to the series finale of the 2017 version but with a major difference: instead of being jealous of Mildred's promotion, Ethel manages to make amends with Mildred for all the trouble they went through and it was enough for Mildred to offer Ethel to be her adviser, who happily accepts.
