= Georgina Sherrington =

English actress

- Born: Anne Georgina Sherrington; 26 July 1985 (age 41); Westminster, London, England
- Other name: Georgina Boote
- Education: Wimbledon High School; Princeton University
- Occupation: Actress
- Years active: 1998–present
- Employer: See-Saw Films
- Known for: The Worst Witch; Weirdsister College
- Spouse: Jeremy Boote
- Children: 2

Georgina Sherrington (born 26 July 1985) is an English actress. Sherrington portrayed Mildred Hubble in two series beginning with The Worst Witch (1998–2001) and concluding with Weirdsister College. She made a guest appearance in a spin-off The New Worst Witch. She has appeared in several short films.

== Career ==
=== The Worst Witch ===
Sherrington is best known for her portrayal of the character of Mildred Hubble in the children's series The Worst Witch (1998–2001), as well as the spin-off series Weirdsister College - The Further Adventures of The Worst Witch (2001), a British/Canadian co-production between ITV and TV Ontario, screened on HBO in North America, ABC in Australia, and on various other networks worldwide. In 2000 she won a Young Artist Award for Best Performance in a TV Comedy Series - Leading Young Actress for her work in The Worst Witch.

Sherrington reprised her role in the first episode of The New Worst Witch (2005). Her character is seen dropping off her cousin Henrietta Hubble, the titular protagonist at Cackle's Academy for Witches. Sherrington and Clare Coulter were the only cast members to reprise their roles from The Worst Witch.

She shared her memories about The Worst Witch in an interview while working on the short Stop/Eject and 2026's Cackles After Dark podcast hosted by one of her co-stars, Holly Rivers.

=== Short films ===
Sherrington has appeared in several short films including Talk (2010), Steamboat (2011) and Stop/Eject (2014).

=== Other work ===
Sherrington relocated back to London in 2010 after spending time in the Los Angeles area. She worked at the BBC in the Drama Commissioning team and several production companies. She is currently working as a development consultant at See-Saw Films.

== Personal life ==
She was a student at Wimbledon High School, London, and graduated from Princeton University in 2008, where she was a member of Princeton Tower Club. At Princeton, she directed Love's Labours Lost in April 2006 and a Shakespeare Festival in 2007, and served as director, assistant director, and actress in various productions in 2007, including The Winter's Tale.

In October 2020, Sherrington announced on her Instagram, she was pregnant with her first child, a boy who was born in February 2021 with her long term partner Jeremy Boote.

She has three younger brothers.

== Filmography ==
Year	Title	Role	Notes	Ref.
1998–2001	The Worst Witch	Mildred Hubble	38 Episodes	
2001	Weirdsister College	Mildred Hubble	Series 1 (13 episodes)	
2005	The New Worst Witch	Mildred Hubble	Episode: Give a Witch a Bad Name (Guest Star)	
2010	Talk	Girl	Short	
2011	The White Box	The Advisor	Short	
2011	Steamboat	Juliana	Short, Writer, Editor and Producer	
2012	All in the Method	Georgina	Episode: The Acting Guru	
2013	Stop/Eject	Kate	Short	
2014	Tag	Miss Locklee		
2015	Welcome to Purgatory	Skinny Shaitan	Renamed Dark Ascension	
2016	Welcome to Purgatory II: The Journey to Hell	Skinny Shaitan	Also known as Dark Ascension II: The Journey to Hell	
