= Kate Duchêne =

British Actress (born 1959)

- Born: Catherine Anne Purves Duchêne; 5 January 1959 (age 66); Plaistow, London, England
- Occupation: Actress
- Years active: 1987–present
- Notable work: The Worst Witch (1998–2001); Afterlife (2005–2006)
- Partner: Robert Hickson
- Children: 2

Kate Duchêne (/duːˈʃɛn/, born Catherine Anne Purves Duchêne; 5 January 1959) is an English actress best known for her role as the teacher Miss Hardbroom in the adaptation of the children's books The Worst Witch.

== Career ==
Duchêne started to act at the age of 14. She studied French and Spanish at Trinity College, Cambridge in the 1980s, where she became a member of the Footlights theatre group, writing and performing her own material. She also acted with the Cambridge Mummers, appearing in such plays as Measure For Measure (as Isabella) in Cambridge and the Edinburgh Fringe. In the 1980s she joined the Traverse Theatre in Edinburgh, appearing in the premiere productions of Losing Venice and The White Rose. Since 2000 she has appeared frequently at the National Theatre in London, frequently working with director Katie Mitchell.

She briefly went to Spain, teaching English to children, and returned in 1986.

=== Television ===
Duchêne is best known for her work as Miss Constance Hardbroom, the strict "deputy head and potions teacher" on the popular TV series The Worst Witch. She stayed with the programme for its three-year run, and appeared in the first episode of its 2001 spinoff Weirdsister College but did not return for the second spinoff, The New Worst Witch (2005–2006). Later projects included Afterlife, a paranormal drama series, and extensive theatre work.

=== Radio ===
From October 1987 to July 1991, Duchêne played Alex Parker in BBC Radio 4's drama series Citizens. In 2013 she guest-starred in the final Series 4 episode of Cabin Pressure, playing a captain in the service of a Zurich-based airline.

== Private life ==
Duchêne spent her infancy in France, and was brought back to England permanently in 1962, residing in the seaside town of Brighton. Her partner is Robert Hickson. As of 2010, they have 2 children.

== Filmography ==
Title	Year	Role	Notes
Miss Marple	1987	Rose	Episode 7 – "At Bertram's Hotel"
Boon	1987	Pregnant Lady	Series 2, Episode 11 – "Paper Mafia"
The Tall Guy	1989	Old Girlfriend	Feature film
A Sense of Guilt	1990	Marsha Hinde	Series 1 – Episodes 3 & 5
This Is David Harper	1990	Caroline Jones	Episode 1
The Bill	1996	Helen Palmer	Series 12, Episode 134 – "Trust Me"
Kiss Me Kate	1998	Lesley	Series 1, Episode 2 – "Mike"; Series 1, Episode 3 – "Calendar"
Out of Hours	1998	Sue Craven	Episode 2
Calendar Girls	1999		Short film
Peak Practice	1999	Jenny Ryan	Series 8, Episode 5 – "Buying Time"
The Bill	2000	Laura	Series 16, Episode 11 – "On the Wagon"
Midsomer Murders	2000	Jane Bennett	Series 4, Episode 1 – "Garden of Death"
The Worst Witch	1998–2001	Miss Constance Hardbroom	Lead role Series 1–4 – 52 episodes
Weirdsister College	2001	Miss Constance Hardbroom	Sequel to The Worst Witch; Series 1, Episode 1 – "The All-Seeing Eye"
Monsieur N.	2003	Madame Balcombe	Feature film
Casualty	2004	Debbie Hansell	Series 18, Episode 32 – "Forget Me Not"
Family Affairs	2005	Carrie Lawson	Episodes 2222 & 2223
Afterlife	2005–2006	Barbara Sinyard	Lead role Series 1 & 2 – 13 episodes
An Education	2009	Latin Teacher	Feature film
All Good Children	2010	Lynne	Feature film
Foyle's War	2013	Helen Fraser	Series 7, Episode 1 – "The Eternity Ring"
Doctors	2013	Sarah Jones	Episode 2502 – "The Girl Next Door"
Roxane	2019	Wendy	French movie
