= Sara Botsford =

Canadian actress (born 1951)

- Born: August 4, 1951 (age 74); Dobie, Ontario, Canada
- Occupation: Actress
- Years active: 1977–present
- Spouse: Alan Scarfe (divorced)
- Children: 3, including Jonathan Scarfe

Sara Botsford (born August 4, 1951) is a Canadian television and film actress. She starred in the CTV drama series E.N.G. (1989–1994) for which received Canadian Screen Award for Best Actress in a Continuing Leading Dramatic Role.

== Career ==
She is probably best known for her role of Ann Hildebrand in the television series E.N.G. for which she won a Gemini Award for Best Performance by an Actress in a Continuing Leading Dramatic Role. Before this role, her most remembered role is the wickedly evil character of Lillith McKechnie, AKA Isabella, on the daytime drama As the World Turns from 1988 to 1990. In Dangerous Offender: The Marlene Moore Story (1996), she portrayed Marlene Moore's (Brooke Johnson) lawyer. In 2002, she portrayed Kathleen Sinclair in the TV movie Trudeau about the life of the late Prime Minister Pierre Elliott Trudeau. In 2003 she appeared in Burn: The Robert Wraight Story.

Her film roles have included appearances in Crossbar (1979), By Design, Murder by Phone, Deadly Eyes, the Hitchcockian thriller Still of the Night (all 1982), Legal Eagles (1986), Jumpin' Jack Flash (1986), and The Gunrunner (1989), opposite Kevin Costner. More recently she played a hotel owner in the American Old West in Tremors 4: The Legend Begins (2004), and Kathy Williams in the remake of The Fog (2005). She played Marilla Cuthbert in the 2016 Anne of Green Gables TV movie, opposite Martin Sheen, and its two sequels.

== Personal life ==
Botsford and Alan Scarfe had one child. Her son Jonathan is also an actor. Her only marriage was to James Hurdle with whom she had two sons, Gideon and Quinn. She currently lives with Christopher "CB" Brown, with whom she has a theatre company, 49th Parallel Theatre. Their mandate is to produce Canadian plays and adaptations for an American audience. They are based in Los Angeles. They also are the creators of the award-winning web series Those Damn Canadians, starring Christopher Shyer and Lynda Boyd.

== Filmography ==
=== Film ===
Year	Title	Role	Notes
1981	By Design	Angie	Nominated — Genie Award for Best Performance by an Actress in a Leading Role
1982	Murder by Phone	Ridley Taylor	
1982	Deadly Eyes	Kelly Leonard	
1982	Still of the Night	Gail Phillips	
1986	Legal Eagles	Barbara	
1986	Jumpin' Jack Flash	Sarah Billings	
1989	The Gunrunner	Maude	
2004	Tremors 4: The Legend Begins	Christine Lord	Nominated — DVD Exclusive Award for Best Actress
2004	Eulogy	Mrs. Carmichael	
2005	Anne: Journey to Green Gables	Mrs. Barry / Frau Schuller (voice)	Video
2005	The Fog	Kathy Williams	
2008	Broken Windows	Mary	
2011	Matty Hanson and the Invisibility Ray	Dr. Angelina Haas	
2015	River	Dr. Stephanie Novella	
2015	He Said	Higard	Short

=== Television ===
Year	Title	Role	Notes
1977	The Fighting Men	Maggie	TV film
1979	The Great Detective	Sarah Norris	"Bloodhounds Can't Fly"
1979	Crossbar	Tricia	TV film
1983	ABC Afterschool Special	Mrs. Jacobs	"The Hand Me Down Kid"
1984	Guiding Light	Lucy Rogers	Guest role
1985	The Equalizer	Angelica	Episode: "The Lock Box"
1987	Street Legal	Eleanor Purvis	"A Matter of Honour"
1988	As the World Turns	Lilith McKechnie	"Before Mac & Nancy's Wedding"
1989–1994	E.N.G.	Ann Hildebrandt	Main role Canadian Screen Award for Best Actress in a Continuing Leading Dramatic Role (1993); Nominated — Canadian Screen Award for Best Actress in a Continuing Leading Dramatic Role (1994)
1992	Fatal Memories	Janice	TV film
1994	Madison	Dakota Graham	"Family Passions"
1994	My Breast	Eve	TV film
1995	Pointman	Rhonda	"My Momma's Back"
1995	The Wright Verdicts	Mercedes De Pedroso	"Pilot"
1995	Sliders	Mayor Anita Ross	"The Weaker Sex"
1996	Dangerous Offender: The Marlene Moore Story	Heather Allen	TV film
1997	The Arrow	Kate O'Hara	TV miniseries Nominated — Canadian Screen Award for Best Performance by an Actress in a Leading Role in a Dramatic Program or Mini-Series
1997	Black Harbour	Lee Colwell	"A Rock and a Hard Place", "You Can't Get There from Here"
1997	Law & Order	Diane Posner	"Passion"
1998	Beyond Belief: Fact or Fiction	Ann Ross	"The Lady in a Black Dress"
1998	The Fixer	Bonnie	TV film
1999	Total Recall 2070	Maria Schviller	"Self-Inflicted"
1999	The Outer Limits	Dr. Gail Cowlings	"The Shroud"
1999	Our Guys: Outrage at Glen Ridge	Mrs. Ros Faber	TV film
1999	The Lot	Norma St. Claire	TV film
1999	Ricky Nelson: Original Teen Idol	Harriet Nelson	TV film
1999	The West Wing	Jenny McGarry	"Five Votes Down"
2000	Family Law	Judge Evelyn LaVoy	"Media Relations"
2000	Judging Amy	Laura Boulton	"The God Thing"
2001	The District	Lucia Burns	"Don't Fence Me In"
2001	Crossing Jordan	Lauren Ryder	"Believers"
2002	Trudeau	Kathleen Sinclair	TV film
2002	NYPD Blue	Helen Walsh	"Healthy McDowell Movement"
2003	Tom Stone	Elinor Galbraithe	"Live by the Sword"
2003	Burn: The Robert Wraight Story	Meredith Farley	TV film
2005	Without a Trace	Roberta Kanner	"Party Girl"
2005	The L Word	Allen Barnes	"Loyal", "Land Ahoy"
2006	Numb3rs	Susan Weinar	"The Running Man"
2006	Three Moons Over Milford	Martha Deekins	"Moon Giver"
2007	NCIS	Dr. Helen Berkley	"Brothers in Arms"
2007	ER	Mrs. Calder	"The Honeymoon Is Over"
2008	Those Damn Canadians	Ellen Baines Heart	"Pilot"
2008	Medium	Constance Madsen	"Lady Killer"
2008–09	Sophie	Estelle Burroughs	Main role
2009	Raising the Bar	Judge Olive Bussman	"Happy Ending", "Maybe, Baby"
2010	Cold Case	Joan Coulson	"Two Weddings"
2011	Body of Proof	Louisa Armstrong	"Point of Origin"
2012	The Mentalist	Judge Isley Markman	"At First Blush"
2014	Lizzie Borden Took an Ax	Abby Morse Borden	TV film
2015	Bosch	Audrey Blaylock	"High Low"
2015	The Lizzie Borden Chronicles	Abby Morse Borden	"Acts of Borden"
2015	Christmas Incorporated	Garrity Wharton	TV film
2015	The Curse of Clara: A Holiday Tale	Ballet Mistress	TV film
2016	L.M. Montgomery's Anne of Green Gables	Marilla Cuthbert	TV film Nominated — Canadian Screen Award for Best Performance by an Actress in a Leading Role in a Dramatic Program or Mini-Series
2016	Ride	Lady Covington	Main role
2016	Incorporated	Red Zone Hacker	"Human Resources"
2017	L.M. Montgomery's Anne of Green Gables: The Good Stars	Marilla Cuthbert	TV film
2017	L.M. Montgomery's Anne of Green Gables: Fire & Dew	Marilla Cuthbert	TV film
2017–22	Claws	Mrs. Coombs	2 episodes
2018–21	Holly Hobbie	Helen Hobbie	30 episodes
