= Trick or treat (disambiguation) =

Trick or treat or trick-or-treating is a Halloween activity.

Trick or Treat may also refer to:

== Film ==
- Trick or Treat (1952 film), a Disney cartoon short featuring Donald Duck
- Trick or Treat (unfinished film), a film by Michael Apted begun in 1975
- Trick or Treats, a 1982 horror film
- Trick or Treat (1986 film), a horror film directed by Charles Martin Smith
- Trick 'r Treat, a 2007 horror film directed by Michael Dougherty
- Trick or Treat (2019 film), a British thriller film

== Music ==
- Trick or Treat (band), an Italian power metal music group
- Trick or Treat (Fastway album), 1987, the soundtrack from the 1986 film
- Trick or Treat (Paul Brady album), 1991
- "Trick or Treat", a song by Diamond Head from Four Cuts
- "Trick or Treat", a song by Robert Cray from Sweet Potato Pie
- "Trick or Treat", a song by Peaches from I Feel Cream

== Television ==
- Trick or Treat (TV series), a British series featuring Derren Brown

=== Episodes ===
- "Trick or Treat" (The Beverly Hillbillies)
- "Trick or Treat" (Bewitched)
- "Trick or Treat" (Boston Legal)
- "Trick or Treat" (Charles in Charge)
- "Trick or Treat" (Clueless)
- "Trick or Treat" (Curb Your Enthusiasm)
- "Trick or Treat" (Cyberchase)
- "Trick or Treat" (Gotham Girls)
- "Trick or Treat" (Holby City)
- "Trick or Treat" (Monster Warriors)
- "Trick or Treat" (The New Worst Witch)
- "Trick or Treat" (Roseanne)
- "Trick or Treat" (Mighty Morphin Power Rangers)
- "Trick or Treat" (Tales from the Darkside)
- "Trick or Treat" (Teen Mom)
- "Trick or Treat" (Where on Earth Is Carmen Sandiego?)
- "Trick or Treat", an episode of Super Café
