= Clare Coulter =

Canadian actress (born 1942)

- Born: 1942 (age 83–84)
- Occupation: Actress
- Known for: The Worst Witch; By Design; Cross My Heart

Clare Coulter (born 1942) is a Canadian actress. Although she has appeared in film, television and stage roles, she is most highly regarded for her stage work.

== Career ==
Coulter's noted stage roles have included Eleanor in the original production of George F. Walker's Love and Anger, the first English-language production of Michel Tremblay's Albertine in Five Times, and a 2013 Harbourfront Centre production of King Lear in which she became one of relatively few women to have portrayed the title role.

She also appeared in the films The Wars, When Night Is Falling, The Five Senses, Saint Monica, Away from Her and We Are Gold (Nous sommes Gold), and in the television series The Newsroom, The Worst Witch, This Is Wonderland and Living in Your Car.

== Filmography ==
=== Film ===
Year	Title	Role	Notes
1981	By Design	Ms. Hirshorn	
1982	Murder by Phone	Bag Lady	
1983	The Wars	Eena	
1985	Terminal Choice	Nurse Barton	
1986	The Last Season	Marie Jazda	
1995	When Night Is Falling	Tillie	
1997	A Simple Wish	Ms. Bramble	
1999	The Five Senses	Clare	
2002	Saint Monica	Mary	
2003	Hollywood North	Lindsay Marshall	
2006	Away from Her	Phoebe Hart	
2015	The Saver	Mrs. Cooper	
2015	My One Demand	—N/a	Documentary
2017	Cross My Heart	La grand-mère	
2019	The Hottest August	Narrator	Documentary
2024	Drive Back Home	Adelaide	
2024	The Apprentice	Mrs. Nathanson	
2024	Of May	May	Short film
2025	The Dogs	Hannah Murphy	
2025	A Dios	Clare	Short film
2025	Feed	Lady	Short film
2026	Permanent Damage	Mrs. Whynot	
TBA	The Land of Nod	Marie	Post-production

=== Television ===
Year	Title	Role	Notes
1956	ITV Television Playhouse	School Child	Episode: "The Grand Tour"
1985	Evergreen	Mary Malone	3 episodes
1986	The Ray Bradbury Theater	Store Owner	Episode: "The Town Where No One Got Off"
1986	The Marriage Bed	Margaret Neilson	Television film
1990	Street Legal	Alexandra Mann	Episode: "The Bracelet"
1991	Deadly Betrayal: The Bruce Curtis Story	Alice Curtis	Television film
1995	The Shamrock Conspiracy	Mae Dillon	Television film
1997	The Newsroom	George's Mother	2 episodes
1998–2001	The Worst Witch	Amelia Cackle	38 episodes
1998	Due South	Barbara Kowalski	Episode: "Easy Money"
1999	Foolish Heart	Psychiatrist	Episode: "The Correct Decision"
1999	Emily of New Moon	Queen Victoria	Episode: "Command Performance"
2003	A Taste of Shakespeare	1st Witch	Episode: "Macbeth"
2003	Coast to Coast	Juliette	Television film
2004–2005	This Is Wonderland	Ellie Germaine	3 episodes
2005–2007	The New Worst Witch	Amelia Cackle	17 episodes
2010–2011	Living in Your Car	Jess Unger	5 episodes
2015	Helix	Sister Agnes	5 episodes
2016	American Gothic	Ramona Canby	Episode: "Kindred Spirits"
2022	Three Pines	Ruth Zardo	8 episodes
2023	Fargo	Irma	3 episodes
2024	Star Trek: Discovery	Kalzara Bix	Episode: "Jinaal"
2025	Severance	Rose	Episode: "Sweet Vitriol"
2026	The Body (TV series)	Sister Imelda	TV Series

== Awards and nominations ==
Coulter has received numerous accolades and praise for her acting work, especially in theatre where she earned international recognition for her role as King Lear, one of the few women to ever play the role.

Year	Organisation	Award	Work	Result
1981	Genie Awards	Best Performance by an Actress in a Supporting Role	By Design	Nominated
1984	Dora Mavor Moore Awards	Outstanding Performance	Top Girls	Won
2003	Vancouver Film Critics Circle	Best Supporting Actress-Canadian Film	Saint Monica	Nominated
2004	Gemini Awards	Best Performance by an Actress in a Guest Role in a Dramatic Series	This Is Wonderland (episode six)	Nominated
2018	Canadian Screen Awards	Performance by an Actress in a Supporting Role	Cross My Heart	Nominated
2024	Rio Webfest	Best Cast (Comedy)	I Will Bury You	Nominated
2024	Bilbao Seriesland Festival	Best Ensemble Cast	I Will Bury You	Nominated
2024	Sydney Web Fest	Best Supporting Actor	I Will Bury You	Nominated
2024	die Serial	Best Supporting Performance	I Will Bury You	Nominated
