= The Worst Witch (1998 TV series) =

1998–2001 British-Canadian television series

- Series title card
- Genre: Fantasy; Comedy
- Based on: The Worst Witch by Jill Murphy
- Written by: Martin Riley (23 ep.); Garry Lyons (12 ep.); Clive Endersby (2 ep.); Graham Mitchell (2 ep.); David Finley (1 ep.)
- Directed by: Andrew Morgan (16 ep.); Stefan Pleszczynski (15 ep.); Alex Kirby (5 ep.); John Smith (4 ep.)
- Starring: Georgina Sherrington; Felicity Jones; Una Stubbs; Clare Coulter; Kate Duchêne; Jessica Fox
- Theme music composer: Paul K. Joyce
- Opening theme: "Onwards Ever Striving Onwards" by the Choir of Wispers School for Girls
- Ending theme: "Onwards Ever Striving Onwards"
- Composer: Paul K. Joyce
- Countries of origin: United Kingdom; Canada
- Original language: English
- No. of series: 3
- No. of episodes: 40 (list of episodes)

Production
- Executive producers: Michael Haggiag; Arnie Gelbart; Dan Maddicott; Jeff Lotman (series 2)
- Producers: Angela Beeching (30 ep.); Michael Haggiag (10 ep.)
- Production locations: Twickenham Film Studios, London; Loseley Park, Guildford; Castell Coch, Wales (Opening); Montreal, Quebec, Canada
- Running time: 30 minutes
- Production companies: United Productions; Galafilm Productions; Global Arts

Original release
- Network: ITV (CITV) (UK); YTV (Canada)
- Release: 22 October 1998 – 26 January 2001

Related
- The Worst Witch (1986 TV film); Weirdsister College (2001); The New Worst Witch (2005–07); The Worst Witch (2017–20)

The Worst Witch is a children's fantasy television series produced for ITV and YTV which ran from 1998 to 2001 with an original TV film produced in 1986. The series is based on Jill Murphy's book series of the same name, and centres on a group of young witches who train in an academy for magicians called Cackles Academy. It aired for a total of 40 episodes spread over three television series between 1998 and 2001, before being followed by its sequel Weirdsister College. Most episodes revolved around the academy, following the adventures of the worst witch ever, Mildred, her friends and rivals. The television series was later followed by The New Worst Witch, which ran for two series and chronicled the experiences of Mildred's younger cousin Hettie as she attended the school.

A new adaptation, a UK-German co-production between CBBC, ZDF and Netflix, also titled The Worst Witch, premiered in January 2017 and ran for four seasons, concluding in 2020.

As of 2026, one of the cast members, Holly Rivers is hosting a podcast Cackle's After Dark. The podcast features interviews with some of the cast.

== Overview ==
The series stars Georgina Sherrington as the lead character of Mildred Hubble, a disaster-prone young witch who attends Cackle's Academy for Witches.

Jessica Fox plays the character of Enid Nightshade, one of Mildred's friends. Felicity Jones plays Mildred's enemy Ethel Hallow in Season One before being replaced by Katy Allen for Seasons Two and Three.

Clare Coulter portrays the school's Headmistress Miss Cackle, Kate Duchêne plays Deputy Head Miss Hardbroom, Una Stubbs plays Chanting Teacher Miss Bat and Claire Porter plays PE Teacher Miss Drill.

New recurring characters included Merlin Langstaff, a wizard apprentice who befriended Mildred; his two mean-spirited acquaintances – Barry "Baz" Dragonsbane and Gary "Gaz" Grailquest; Charlie, Frank Blossom's nephew who really wanted to be a witch at first, but then later decided to train to be a wizard; Mrs. Cosie, the nervous owner of the nearby tearoom; and Mistress Hecketty Broomhead, the evil school inspector who later became headmistress for a brief time. A character who also appears more than once is Egbert Hellibore, chief wizard and headmaster of Camelot Castle, where Merlin, Charlie, Baz and Gaz live. The first series dramatised The Worst Witch and The Worst Witch Strikes Again, and the second series dramatised A Bad Spell For The Worst Witch and The Worst Witch All At Sea. Both of these two series also contained original stories. The third and final series continued with purely original material.

== Characters ==
=== Pupils ===
- Mildred Hubble (Georgina Sherrington) – Mildred is the protagonist of The Worst Witch series. She is a clumsy, bungling young witch-in-training, who never seems to get anything right at Miss Cackle's Academy for Witches. She is tall, with long, straggly dark plaits, and never ties her bootlaces. Mildred does not come from a witch family like most of the other girls, but earns a scholarship at Cackle's Academy through a first-class piece of creative writing (she is portrayed as being creative throughout the series, especially in art) which greatly impresses Miss Cackle. Mildred is kind-hearted and well-meaning and tries very hard, but she is adventurous and impulsive, which often gets her into trouble with her teachers, most notably the fearsome Miss Hardbroom. Creating havoc wherever she goes, mixing up spells and potions, Mildred is a walking disaster, frequently destroying the potion lab and often on the brink of bringing utter peril upon the school, but as she also has a knack of saving the teachers, the pupils and sometimes the whole academy from destruction, she always escapes getting expelled. Although her Mathematics and Science skills leave much to be desired, Mildred is tenacious and channels her creative energy into her quest to become an accomplished witch. Mildred has an ongoing feud with Ethel Hallow, which lasts throughout the entire Worst Witch series and into the Weirdsister episodes. After five years at Cackle's Academy, Mildred goes on to university, training at Weirdsister College in Cambridge, a place she gained entry to through her artistic skills. At Weirdsister, she seems to improve her skills, and is shocked to discover that Ethel Hallow is her roommate, though the two later become friends. Mildred is briefly seen in the first episode of The New Worst Witch, now an accomplished and successful witch despite her struggles at school, escorting her younger cousin Henrietta "Hettie" Hubble on her first day at Cackle's Academy.
- Ethel Hallow (Felicity Jones – series 1; Katy Allen) – Ethel is Mildred Hubble's acid-tongued rival. She is a "straight-A" student, comes from a prominent and historic witch family, and gives the impression of being a model student to her classmates. She is spoiled, snobbish and vindictive; though in the presence of the school's teachers she can turn on the charm and act sweet and innocent, playing the role of a victim to Mildred's apparent bullying. Ethel takes pleasure in taunting Mildred about her inability to train her cat, to ride a broomstick, and Mildred responds by turning Ethel into a pig. From then on Mildred and Ethel resent one another and Ethel vows to get Mildred expelled, though she does not succeed. Ethel has many talents, among them pouting, bossing people around and insinuating herself into important people's graces. As she is one of "THE" Hallows and her father is the chair of the board of governors, she regards herself as superior to all the other pupils at Cackle's. Ethel and her only friend, Drusilla Paddock, are shown to be allies rather than true friends, sticking together because nobody else likes them, but in the episode "The Unfairground", they end their friendship because Drusilla agrees with Mildred and her friends' attempts to stand up to the teachers. In contrast to her personality, Ethel is an attractive young girl who matures into a beautiful and popular teenager at Weirdsister College. In her second year at Cackle's, she altered her appearance via a magical makeover (a "Witch-over"), initially to hide the fact she is the sister of whiny Sybil Hallow, but the result turned out so well she decided to keep it for the remainder of her time at the academy. When she came to Weirdsister College, Ethel felt as though it was safe to change back, and she resumed her original appearance. Strangely enough, when Ethel and Mildred are reunited at Weirdsister, they overcome their hatred of each other and become friends. Felicity Jones was replaced by Katy Allen for Series 2–3.
- Maud Moonshine (Emma Brown, credited as Emma Jayne Brown in Series 3) – Maud is Mildred's best friend at Cackle's Academy. She is a short girl with wide glasses and stringy hair that she wears in bunches. She is fiercely loyal to Mildred and assists her on most of her adventures, often against her better judgement. Maud is a decent and considerate person, but grows weary of Mildred's incessant clumsiness and often lectures her on how to improve herself. While usually very gentle, she can become quite snappy when someone attacks her best friends, even daring to face Miss Hardbroom in defence of Mildred. In the episode "Monkey Business", Maud grows jealous of Mildred and Enid's budding friendship and turns on Mildred, siding with the friendless and vindictive Ethel. Ultimately she tires of Ethel's constant degrading of Mildred and annuls their "friendship", siding with Mildred and befriending Enid. Mostly she is the voice of reason and tries to prevent Enid from leading Mildred down the path of mischief. Maud runs against Ethel for the Head Girl position in the final episode, but stands down at the last minute, stating that Mildred is better suited to the post.
- Enid Nightshade (Jessica Fox) – Enid is another of Mildred's close friends, who is introduced in the episode "Monkey Business" after she is transferred to Cackle's Academy and Mildred is assigned as her guardian. She is a small, waiflike girl and, at first, Mildred thinks she will simply be a nuisance, but Enid turns out to be a wild practical joker whose attempts to make Mildred like her, only result in getting Mildred into trouble. Overall she is friendly and kindhearted, but sometimes oversteps the mark in her attempt to befriend and help people. She takes an instant liking to Mildred and hopes to be her friend. She knows many spells and uses them regardless of the Witches' Code – i.e.: for selfish and trivial ends. Often her spells don't work as they are supposed to do, and her friends end up in deep water as a result. Enid made a guest appearance in episode 10 of Weirdsister College, as the gothic and rebellious Enid. She flew in from her college to surprise Mildred, stating that she needed a break, but she was really expelled for over-partying. She tried to persuade Mildred to leave Weirdsister and go travelling around the world, but Mildred insisted on staying and finishing her training. Enid agreed and stated that they would always remain friends, before departing. At the end of the episode "Monkey Business", she euphemistically indicates that schools are coming to an end in the real world.
- Drusilla Paddock (Holly Rivers) – Drusilla is Ethel's best and only friend. She is a vindictive bully but lacks the acid-tongued spite of Ethel, and seems to be in awe of her. Drusilla and Ethel have stuck together because nobody else can bear to be around them, their "friendship" seeming to be more of an alliance. Drusilla shows reluctance or regret about Ethel's schemes several times during the run of the show. Although she has occasionally teamed up with Mildred and her friends behind Ethel's back (and seems to get along remarkably well with them), she always ends up reverting to Ethel, but in the last two episodes of Series 3, she and Ethel end their friendship for good after Drusilla sides with Mildred.
- Ruby Cherrytree (Joanna Dyce) – Ruby is another friend of Mildred's. She is depicted as very tall, with frizzy hair worn in pigtails and an inventive personality. Ruby is very loyal to her friends and keen to learn at Cackle's Academy. She is also heavily addicted to all kinds of "electronic contrivances" and therefore a thorn in the flesh of old-fashioned Miss Hardbroom. The amount of walkmen, discmen, mini ghettoblasters, Game Boys, cyber pets, walkie talkies etc. confiscated by her form teacher is quite impressive. As she gets older, Ruby creates a number of wacky inventions that almost always go wrong, such as when she created a time machine and accidentally brought two Dark Age witches forward in time, who resumed their historic battle in the Academy. It was left to Mildred and Miss Hardbroom to save the school. Ruby also makes a transportation device that gives the wearer the equivalent of Miss Hardbroom's power to appear and disappear at will, except that in the episode "Just Like Clockwork", Mistress Broomhead tried it on and it went so wrong that she was temporarily paralysed / sent into a trance to use up all the time she saved whizzing about the spells classroom.
- Jadu Wali (Harshna Brahmbhatt) – Jadu is another of Mildred's close friends. She is mostly very sensible and, during the first two years at Cackle's, of a rather meek nature, yet she is often dragged along on whatever crazy crusade Mildred and the others are going on. Jadu is very keen to learn and shows mature behaviour, until the episode "The Unfairground", where she and Mildred attempt to rebel against the rules, fighting for students' rights and opposing the staff ("No uniforms, permission to go out of bounds and more chips!"). As a result, she is suspended and kept in isolation, but along with Mildred she is saved from expulsion by Maud, Ruby and Enid, who conjure up a witch known as "The Uninvited" who attempts to put the whole academy to eternal sleep.

=== Teachers ===
- Miss Amelia Cackle (Clare Coulter) – Miss Cackle is the Headmistress of Cackle's Academy. She is often weary of Mildred's various exploits, but ultimately much fairer and more sympathetic than Miss Hardbroom. Miss Cackle has a love of cheese, cheesecake and cream cakes, and spends most of her free time at Cosie's Tea Rooms. She has an evil twin sister named Agatha (also played by Coulter), who tries to take over the school by magic twice during the first series. The second time, Agatha kidnapped Amelia in the middle of the night, tied her up and locked her in the storeroom. Agatha then pretended to be her sister and ran the school as Headmistress, until Mildred realised she was an impostor and rescued Miss Cackle. Cackle attended Witch Academy with Mistress Hecketty Broomhead, although she knew Broomhead by another name, Wilhelmina Wormwood, and only discovered who she was when Sybil Hallow turned Broomhead back into a child, and she recognised her. Miss Cackle also has a niece, Gabrielle Gribble, who came to the Academy as a student teacher during the episode "Learning the Hard Way". Cackle kept her family connection secret from all the staff, not wanting any special treatment to be given. Clare Coulter is the only actor from the original series who returned for The New Worst Witch.
- Miss Constance Hardbroom (Kate Duchêne) – Miss Hardbroom is the fearsome Deputy Headmistress of Cackle's Academy. Tall, scrawny and sour-faced, she strikes fear into the students' hearts, and seems to have a particular resentment for Mildred. Miss Hardbroom is nicknamed "HB" and is the only witch on the staff with the ability to appear from thin air. She lavishes praise and pampering on the shallow Ethel Hallow, and constantly degrades Mildred in front of the other pupils. Hardbroom is a stickler for standards and tradition, believes in strong discipline and dislikes most of the other teachers, particularly Miss Bat, whom she sees as incompetent and irresponsible. Miss Hardbroom is an exceptionally talented and powerful witch, and it is often left to her to save the day when situations get out of hand. When Miss Cackle's evil sister Agatha and her sidekicks try to take over the school, Agatha states that "Hardbroom is the really dangerous one" and must be dealt with first, suggesting Hardbroom is feared by the adult witch community. Miss Hardbroom is shown to have a kinder side to her, such as when she altered a potions test to make it easier for Mildred. Despite her fearsome nature, it is hinted that Hardbroom is afraid of one witch: Mistress Hecketty Broomhead, her old personal tutor, whom Hardbroom claims to have taught "everything she knows". Miss Hardbroom appeared briefly in the first episode of Weirdsister College, summoned by magic to test Mildred upon entry. Kate Duchêne was replaced by Caroline O'Neill in The New Worst Witch.
- Miss Imogen Drill (Claire Porter) – Miss Drill is the PE teacher, and the only non-magical staff member at Cackle's Academy. Although strict with regards to staying fit and healthy, she is often the teacher most sympathetic towards Mildred. She has a love of the great outdoors and often takes the girls on runs and assault courses in the forest. She has a boyfriend named Serge, whom she met in the episode "The Great Outdoors" – he is the leader of the "Rocky Mountain Rangers", who shared the campsite with Miss Drill and the girls. In the episode "Secret Society", Drill threatens to resign after a run-in with Miss Hardbroom, and states that Serge has offered her a job at his Adventure Centre. Miss Cackle convinces Drill to stay and makes her the supervisor of "Dangerous Old Book Society". Miss Hardbroom is very resentful of Miss Drill being a non-witch, which often angers her, and in the episode "Power Drill" Mildred and her friends decide to help by secretly making a potion to give her witch powers. Believing Miss Drill's powers have developed naturally from being around witches, Miss Cackle is forced to give Miss Drill an investiture and officially name her as a witch. Drill then changed her name to "Hilary Hemlock", but later turned selfish and unreasonable with her new-found powers, causing Mildred to come clean about the potion. After this, Drill takes an antidote and returns to her normal, non-witch state. Miss Drill did not feature in The New Worst Witch.
- Miss Davina Bat (Una Stubbs) – Miss Bat is the slightly loopy Chanting teacher at Cackle's Academy during Series 1 and 2. She lives in the stationery cupboard in the staff room and has a habit of eating bizarre food, including flowers, fungus, sour milk and cat food. Miss Bat is also not the most reliable person in a crisis, as proved in the episode "Alarms and Diversions" when the emergency alarm reduces her to hysterics. In the episode "Old Hats and New Brooms", Miss Bat surprises everyone by returning from Inner Mongolia (she usually spends the summer holiday in the staff-room cupboard). Miss Bat hates Miss Hardbroom and often argues with Miss Drill. When Miss Gimlet, the Second Year class tutor, left at the start of the new term, Miss Bat fought with Miss Drill over which of them should replace her. Miss Cackle eventually decided to let them share the position, but later put Miss Bat in charge of the First Year for half of the term. Miss Bat left Cackle's for unknown reasons at the end of Series 2 and was replaced by Miss Crotchet. Miss Bat does not appear in The New Worst Witch.
- Miss Lavinia Crotchet (Polly James) – Miss Crotchet is the replacement Chanting teacher for Miss Bat, who was introduced in the episode "Secret Society". She has a magical barrel organ which she spends most of her first episode trying to tune. She is similar to Miss Bat but not as loopy and slightly more "up-to-date". During the episode "The Lost Chord", Miss Crotchet was mesmerised by Austrian conductor Professor von Raffenburg, who seduced her and tried to use her to find the famous "Lost Chord". Sybil Hallow discovered he was in fact a conman, who wanted to use the Lost Chord to rob everyone in the school. Miss Crotchet did not feature in The New Worst Witch.

=== Recurring ===
- Griselda Blackwood (Poppy Gaye) – Griselda and her best friend, Fenella, are the main recurring characters of the series. She is nicknamed "Gris" and is in the year above Mildred. She was first seen in "The Battle of the Broomsticks", showing Mildred to her room on her first day. She becomes good friends with Mildred and her group, and appeared in many episodes throughout the series, usually helping Mildred and friends out with spells and potions. Griselda and Fenella are also friends of Sybil and Clarice, and assist them with spells and potions, usually when Mildred and her year group are away.
- Fenella Feverfew (Julia Malewski and Emily Stride) – Fenella, often known as "Fenny", is Griselda Blackwood's best friend, and never seen without her. It is Fenella and Griselda who show Mildred and her friends the secret room under the library that later becomes the "Dangerous Old Book Society" club. Fenella turned Baz and Gaz into statues when they insulted her and Griselda in the episode "Animal Magic". Despite being only one year above Mildred and her friends, Fenella and Griselda appear to know all the history and secrets of the Academy, including secret rooms, the darkest books in the library and even the location of Miss Cackle's secret safe. Julia Malewski was replaced by Emily Stride for Series 3.
- Charlie Blossom (Nicholas Pepper) – Charlie is Frank Blossom's nephew. He first appeared in the episode "A Pig in a Poke" visiting the Academy with his uncle. When Mildred turned Ethel into a pig, he helped her to find Ethel and change her back. He then appeared in the episode "Up in the Air" when he returned to Cackles claiming he wanted to become a witch and asked for a place at the Academy. After realising this was not possible, he became a pupil at the wizard school Camelot College, and appeared in the episode "Better Dead Than Co-Ed" when the Cackles witches visited Camelot College. Charlie also appeared in the Christmas special "Cinderella in Boots", helping backstage and later taking on the role of Prince Charming.
- Frank Blossom (Berwick Kaler) – Frank is the caretaker at Cackles Academy. He is featured in several episodes throughout the series, and made out to be a very superstitious man. When not taking care of the school's maintenance, he is usually found down in the kitchens eating Mrs Tapioca's Italian cooking. He entered into the Gardening Competition in the episode "Green Fingers and Thumbs" with a prize marrow he grew in his greenhouse, until it was destroyed by his competitor, Terry Root. Mildred and her friends then made a "plant-growing" potion to enlarge the size of a smaller marrow. This worked, until it was sabotaged by Ethel and Drusilla. His nephew, Charlie, visits him at Cackles occasionally. He leaves to attend a horticultural college and is replaced by his brother, Ted (Fine Time Fontayne).
- Mistress Hecate Broomhead (Janet Henfrey) – Mistress Broomhead is an OFWITCH inspector and a member of The Witches' Guild. She first appears in the episode "The Inspector Calls", when she visits Cackle's to carry out an OFWITCH inspection. After announcing her intention to close Cackle's Academy by cutting off their GAS (Guild Approved Status), Sybil Hallow turns her back into a child. Miss Cackle then recognises Broomhead as a girl she went to Witch Academy with, and that her real name is Wilhelmina Wormwood. Cackle remembers that Wormwood was a terrible bully who terrorised fellow pupils, turned teachers into reptiles and tried to freeze the entire school inside a block of ice. Wormwood apparently gave the excuse that "a bat bit her when she was young". Cackle promises to turn her back into Hecate Broomhead as long as she agrees that Cackle's Academy has passed the inspection. It is revealed that Broomhead was a teacher herself before becoming an OFWITCH inspector, and that she was Miss Hardbroom's tutor at Witch Training College. Broomhead is both surprised and disappointed to discover that Hardbroom is a teacher, and believes she is wasting her talent working at Cackle's. Like Hardbroom, Broomhead has the ability to appear from thin air – a skill that is revealed she taught to Hardbroom. Mistress Broomhead returns to the Academy in the episode "Just Like Clockwork", to stand in as Acting Headmistress while Miss Cackle is away visiting her sick aunt. Mildred overhears Mr Hallow planning to give Miss Cackle early retirement and make Mistress Broomhead the permanent Headmistress. This does not happen thanks to Miss Hardbroom, who contacts Miss Cackle and persuades her to come back.
- Mrs Cosie (Sheena Larkin) – Mrs Cosie is the owner of the local tea rooms which are in the "out of bounds" area of the forest around the castle, but this does not stop the girls visiting whenever they can. Miss Cackle visits Cosie's regularly due to her love of cream cakes. She was almost forced to sell her tea rooms to a developer named Percy Slyce in the episode "Let Them Eat Cake", but this was foiled by Mildred and her friends. She returned in the episode "An Unforgettable Experience" when she allowed Mildred, Maud, Ethel and Drusilla to do work experience at her cafe.
- Clarice Crow (Georgia Isla Graham) – Clarice is Sybil Hallow's best friend. She is very loyal and steadfast in character, supporting her tearful and less confident friend throughout Series 2. She revealed that she wanted to become a proper witch ever since she was very small. In the episode "The Genius of The Lamp", Clarice and Sybil construct a magic torch that grants them unlimited wishes, enabling them to acquire a more luxurious lifestyle for a while, but the side effects of the magic began to destroy the castle, and the idea had to be abandoned.
- Barry "Baz" Dragonsbane (Paul Child) – Baz is a student wizard who attends Camelot College. He is a bully along with his best friend Gaz, and both enjoy taunting Mildred and her friends when they visit Cackles with their master, Grand Wizard Hellibore. They bully Merlin Langstaff when he is at Camelot, and later Charlie Blossom. In the episode "Better Dead Than Co-Ed", it is revealed that Baz has a crush on Mildred. He appeared in the Christmas special "Cinderella in Boots" as one of the ugly sisters in the pantomime.
- Gary "Gaz" Grailquest (Anthony Hamblin) – Gaz is Baz's best friend, and a fellow pupil at Camelot College. He also appeared in the Christmas special "Cinderella in Boots" as one of the ugly sisters. Like Baz, he also has a secret crush on Mildred.
- Mr Hallow (Patrick Pearson) – Mr Hallow is the Chair of the Governors at Cackles, and Ethel and Sybil's father. He is highly skilled with computers and often tries to get the Academy to modernise and use technology. He showed pop star Amanda Honeydew around the school in the episode "The Millennium Bug" with the intention of persuading her to buy the castle and turn it into her home. He then planned to build a brand new, ulta-modern school and relocate the Academy to it. This plan was foiled by Mildred and Miss Hardbroom, who persuaded Amanda to let Miss Cackle continue to use the castle for the Academy. Although the Hallow name is historic with witches and goes back hundreds of years, Mr Hallow does not appear to have any magical powers himself, suggesting it is his ancestors who derive from witches and he encouraged his daughters to attend Cackles to carry on the tradition.
- Sybil Hallow (Charlotte Knowles) – Sybil Hallow is Ethel's long-suffering younger sister. She starts attending Cackle's Academy as of Series 2, in the year below Ethel and Mildred. During Series 2, she is fairly wimpish in character, and is very easily reduced to tears by fear, pain or pressure. She was initially afraid of Mildred and her friends after being told false stories about them by Ethel, but came to adore Mildred after she rescued her from a magic tornado in the episode "Alarms and Diversions". Mildred did not take Sybil's adoration well, and insulted her and the Hallows to Ethel's face during an argument. More out of personal honour than from any loyalty to her sister, Ethel turned Mildred into a frog in revenge. Although she apparently came to Cackles' Academy under her father's pressure rather than from personal choice, Sybil gradually settles into the school and becomes much more confident and intuitive. She becomes very accomplished in Chanting and playing music, and even manages to save the school from disaster several times. In the episode "The Inspector Calls", she managed to stop Mistress Hecketty Broomhead from closing the school down, as she discovered the spell that turned Broomhead back into a child and thus revealed her past as a juvenile delinquent. Later, in the episode "The Lost Chord", she and Clarice help to stop a phony musician seducing Miss Crotchet and robbing every girl in the school by magic.
- Grand Wizard Egbert Hellibore (Terrence Hardiman and Richard Durden) – The Grand Wizard appeared in several episodes throughout the series, often visiting Cackles Academy with his wizard students. Hellibore is the head of Camelot College for Wizards, and in the episode "Better Dead Than Co-Ed", plans to merge Camelot with Cackles to become a unisex school for witches and wizards. Thanks to Mildred and her friends, this does not happen. Hellibore attended the Academy as a pupil when it was a college for wizards, along with his friend Algernon Rowan-Webb. He is nicknamed "Helli-boring" by most of the pupils and teachers at Cackles, due to his habit of droning on and his belief that wizards are superior to witches. Richard Durden replaced Terrence Hardiman as Hellibore for Series 2, but Hardiman returned for Series 3.
- Merlin Langstaff (Guy Witcher) – Merlin, nicknamed "Loppy Lugs", is a student wizard at Camelot College. He was bullied by Baz and Gaz and accompanied them on several visits to Cackles. He left Camelot College to become Algernon Rowan-Webb's apprentice in "Rowan-Webb's Riverside Retreat". It was Merlin who accidentally released the Dragon Lord from imprisonment in the cave at Rowan-Webb's retreat, and later helped Mildred and her friends to stop him.
- Mrs Tapioca (Annette Badland) – Mrs Tapioca is the school cook. She is Italian and often complains that she has to cook traditional school food for the pupils rather than her own Italian cuisine. She is kindly towards Mildred, and sometimes takes her down to the kitchens to eat "proper" food when she can't finish the school lunch. Thanks to Mildred, at the end of the episode "When We Feast At The Midnight Hour" Miss Cackle allowed Mrs Tapioca to cook pizzas for the girls every Saturday. Mrs Tapioca featured most in the episode "Animal Magic", when she was having a major problem with a rat in the kitchen. During series 2, she was replaced by a new cook called Mrs Semolina (Flaminia Cinque) for a brief period, though in series 3, Mrs. Tapioca's name was mentioned a few times, but she doesn't appear on screen.
- Algernon Rowan-Webb (Paul Copley) – Algernon attended the Academy as a pupil when it was a wizard college, along with Grand Wizard Egbert Hellibore. He was turned into a frog while still a teenager by a fellow pupil named Mortimer Mistletoe. Not having the ability to change himself back, he took up residence in the school pond and remained a frog for over forty years. Mildred met him when Ethel turned her into a frog in the episode "It's a Frog's Life". She vowed to get him restored, but that could only be done by a fellow wizard. Having been banned from the Grand Wizard's lecture, Mildred barges in and explains to Hellibore about Rowan-Webb. Remembering him from wizard college, Hellibore turns Rowan-Webb back into a human. After being returned to human form, he briefly stayed at Camelot College with Hellibore before moving into a large house by the river, taking Merlin Langstaff with him as his apprentice. Rowan-Webb returned to Cackles with Hellibore and three student wizards during a snowstorm, and later hosted a visit at his riverside home for Mildred and her year group, to thank her for saving him.
- Harriet Goodcharm (Charlotte Powell) – Harriet is another student at Cackle's Academy in the same year as Mildred. She is mentioned at the end of the first book, when Maud says that she was the one whom Ethel had told about her plot, and Harriet had told everyone else in Form One. In "Fair Is Foul & Fouls Are Fair", Bryony, Gloria, Harriet and Tansy are the cheerleaders led by Miss Bat.

== Episodes ==
Series	Episodes	Originally released	
Series	Episodes	First released	Last released
1	13	22 October 1998	28 January 1999
2	13	4 November 1999	3 February 2000
3	14	9 November 2000	26 January 2001

== Home media releases ==
=== United Kingdom ===
In the United Kingdom, the series was released on VHS and DVD by Columbia TriStar Home Video. They first released Series 1 on six separate VHS volumes in 2000, followed up with a "Best of" DVD in 2002 containing seven assorted episodes. The first three Series 1 volumes were released on DVD on 12 July 2004, 16 August 2004, and 2005, respectively, through the UCA venture.

=== United States ===
In the United States, series 1 and 2 were released on DVD in 2004.

=== Australia ===
In Australia series 1–3 were released onto DVD as was Weirdsister College, and both series of The New Worst Witch were released in 2007. Series one and two were released as one boxset, containing four discs that play on most DVD players (including the United Kingdom), as well as Series three and Weirdsister College on another boxset.

In 2023, Via Vision released a standalone DVD boxset of Weirdsister College in Australia, titled The Worst Witch: Weirdsister College - The Complete Series.

=== Germany ===
In Germany series 1–3, plus Weirdsister College, were released on DVD by Pidax. As common with many other releases of British television programs in the country; the packaging, subtitles and menus are in German, but it contains the original English soundtrack. Weirdsister College is packaged as Series 4 rather than a separately named release.

== Awards and nominations ==
In 1999, the series was nominated by the Royal Television Society for Best Children's Drama.

In 2000, Georgina Sherrington won the Young Artist Award for Best Performance in a TV Comedy Series – Leading Young Actress.
