= Disguise (disambiguation) =

A disguise is anything which conceals or changes a person's physical appearance.

Disguise or Disguised may also refer to:

- Disguise, a 2019 album by American heavy metal band Motionless in White
- Disguise (novel), a 2008 novel by Irish writer Hugo Hamilton
- Disguises (Cauterize album), 2007
- Disguises (Aiden album), 2011
- Disguises (Robots in Disguise album)
- "Disguises", a song by The Who from the 1966 EP Ready Steady Who later covered by The Jam as the B-Side of their single "Funeral Pyre"
- Disguise, Thoroughbred racehorse, foaled 1897
- Disguised (esports), an esports organization

== See also ==
- Deception (disambiguation)
