= Hugo Hamilton (writer) =

Irish writer (born 1953)

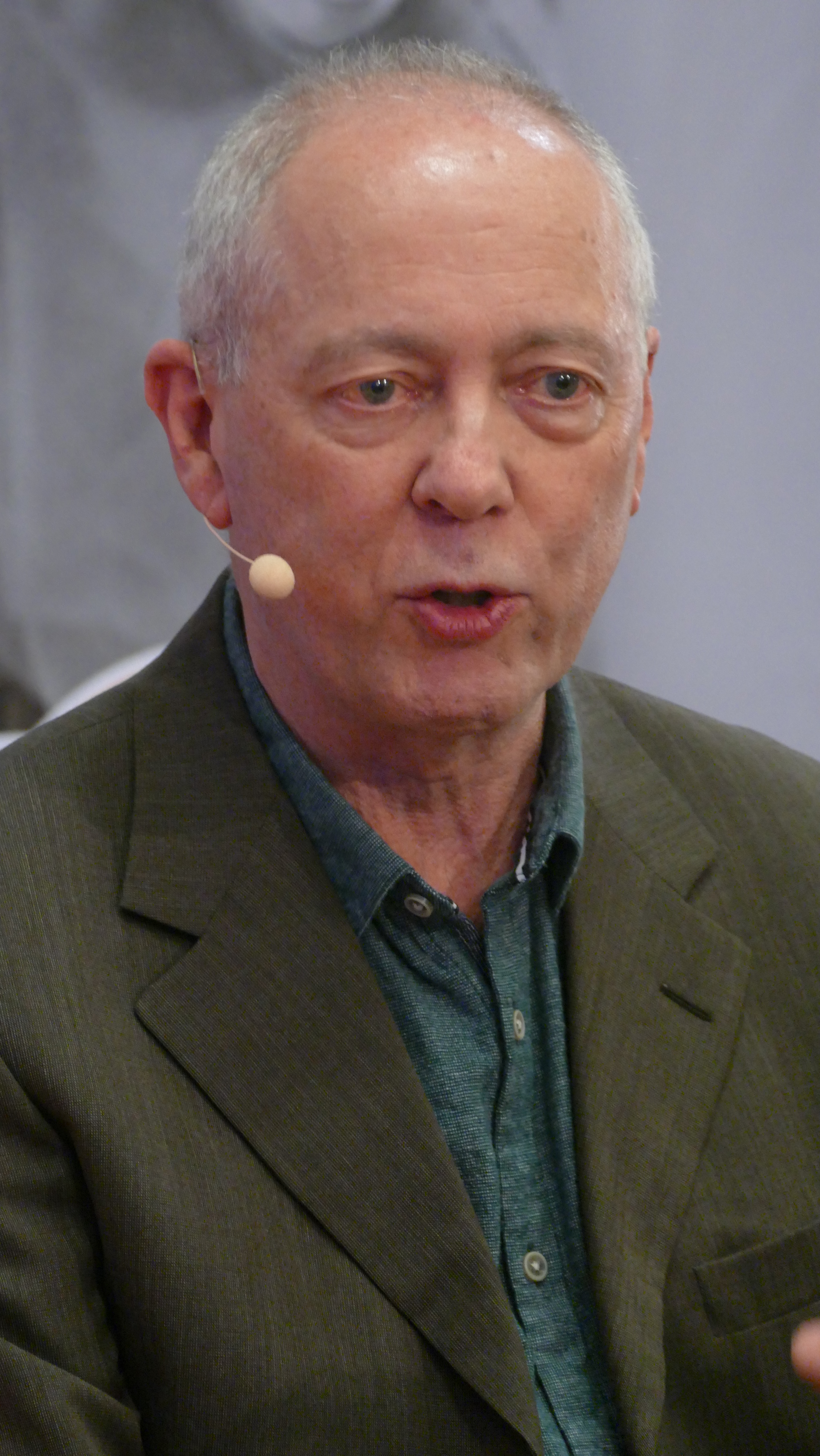
- Hugo Hamilton (2018).
- Born: 28 January 1953 (age 73); Dublin
- Occupations: Writer, Journalist
- Known for: Memoir “The Speckled people”
- Spouse: Mary Rose Doorly

Hugo P. Hamilton (born Johannes Ó hUrmoltaigh, 28 January 1953) is an Irish writer. Hamilton was born and raised in Dublin with an Irish father and a German mother.

== Early life ==
Hamilton's mother was a German Roman Catholic who travelled to Ireland in 1949 on a pilgrimage, married an Irishman, and settled in the country. His father was a strict nationalist who insisted that his children should speak only German or Irish, but not English, a prohibition the young Hugo resisted inwardly. "The prohibition against English made me see that language as a challenge. Even as a child, I spoke to the walls in English and secretly rehearsed dialogue I heard outside," he wrote later. As a consequence of this, he grew up with three languages – English, Irish and German – and a sense of never really belonging to any: "There were no other children like me, no ethnic groups that I could attach myself to".

== Career ==
Hamilton became a journalist, and then a writer of short stories and novels. His first three novels were set in Central Europe. Following a year spent in Berlin on a DAAD cultural scholarship, he completed his memoir of childhood, The Speckled People (2003), which went on to achieve widespread international acclaim. Telling the story through the eyes of his childhood self, it evoked the struggle to make sense of a bizarre 'language war' in which the child perceives going out onto the English-speaking street outside as a daily migration. It "triumphantly avoids ... sentimental nostalgia and victim claims", wrote Hermione Lee in The Guardian "The cumulative effect is to elevate an act of scrupulous remembering into a work of art," commented James Lasdun in The New York Times. The story is picked up in the 2006 volume, The Sailor in the Wardrobe.

In May 2007, German publisher Luchterhand published Die redselige Insel (The Island of Talking), in which Hamilton retraced the journey Heinrich Böll made in Ireland that was to be the basis of his best-selling book Irisches Tagebuch (Irish Journal) in 1957. His fellow Irish writer Anne Enright has described Hamilton as a writer who "loves the spaces between things: his characters live, not just between cultures or between languages, but between the past and the future." Hamilton's 2014 novel, Every Single Minute is a fictional account of an actual journey to Berlin which the author undertook with his fellow writer and memoirist, Nuala O Faolain, who was dying of cancer.

His latest novel Conversation with the Sea was published in August 2025.

== Recognition ==
In 1992 he was awarded the Rooney Prize for Irish Literature. Sang impur, the French translation of The Speckled People, won the Prix Femina étranger in 2004 and Il cane che abbaiava alle onde, the Italian translation of the memoir, won the Premio Giuseppe Berto in 2004. He adapted his memoir The Speckled People for the stage at the Gate Theatre in Dublin in 2011. A new play entitled The Mariner, based on the story of his grandfather returning from the First World War, ran at the Gate Theatre in 2014.

Hamilton is a member of the Irish Arts Academy Aosdána and has been awarded the Bundesverdienstkreuz (Order of Merit of the Federal Republic of Germany) for his unique contribution to literature and understanding between Germany and Ireland.

== Personal life ==
Hugo Hamilton lives in Dublin. He is married to Mary Rose Doorly, of Irish descent but born in Chester and educated in Ireland and Canada. They have three children, including a married son who lives in Berlin.

== Bibliography ==
=== Novels ===
- Surrogate City (1990) ISBN 0-571-14432-2
- The Last Shot (1991) ISBN 0-571-16391-2
- The Love Test (1995) ISBN 0-571-16954-6
- Headbanger (1996) ISBN 0-436-20405-3
- Sad Bastard (1998) ISBN 0-436-20490-8
- Disguise (2008) ISBN 0-00-719216-9
- Hand in the Fire (2010) ISBN 0-007-32482-0
- Every Single Minute (2014) ISBN 0-007-32486-3
- Dublin Palms (2019) ISBN 0-008-12813-8
- The Pages (2022) ISBN 978-0-593-32066-2

=== Short stories ===
- Dublin Where the Palm Trees Grow (1996) ISBN 0-571-17693-3

=== Memoirs ===
- The Speckled People (2003) ISBN 0-00-715663-4
- The Sailor in the Wardrobe (2006) ISBN 0-00-719217-7 [US Title: The Harbor Boys ISBN 0-06-078467-9]

== Drama ==
- The Speckled People (Methuen plays) Gate Theatre 2011
- The Mariner (original stageplay) Gate Theatre 2014
- Text from the novel 'Surrogate City' performed by David Moss in the opera by Heiner Goebbels entitled 'Surrogate Cities'(1994).

=== Foreign-language versions ===
- Every Single Minute: Jede Einzelne Minute (Luchterhand 2014), Un Voyage à Paris (France, 2015)
- Hand in the Fire: Der irische Freund, (Luchterhand, München, Germany 2011)
- The Speckled People: Gescheckte Menschen (Germany, 2004); Sang impur (France, 2004); Il cane che abbaiava alle onde (Italy, 2004); Brakkbarn (Norway, 2004); El perro que ladraba a las olas (Spain, 2005); Sproetenkoppen (Netherlands, 2006); Gent mestissa (Andorra, 2007); Белязаните (Bulgaria, 2008), Люди з веснянками (Ukraine, 2012), Qeni që iu lehte valëve (Albania, 2012), Ar re vrizhellet (Brittany, 2020).
- Headbanger: Der letzte Held von Dublin (Germany, 1999); Déjanté (France, 2006); Lo scoppiato (Italy, 2000)
- The Sailor in the Wardrobe: Der Matrose im Schrank (Germany, 2006); Le marin de Dublin (France, 2006); De verdwijntruc (Netherlands, 2006); Il marinaio nell'armadio (Italy, 2007)
- Sad Bastard: Ein schlechter Verlierer (Germany, 2001)
- The Last Shot: Kriegsliebe (Germany, 1996); L'ultimo sparo (Italy, 2006); Het laatste schot (Netherlands, 2004)
- Surrogate City: Berlin sous la Baltique (France, 1992)
