= Afterlife (TV series) =

British television series created by Stephen Volk

- Genre: Mystery; Drama
- Created by: Stephen Volk
- Starring: Lesley Sharp; Andrew Lincoln; Kate Duchêne; Anna Wilson-Jones
- Country of origin: United Kingdom
- Original language: English
- No. of series: 2
- No. of episodes: 14 (list of episodes)

Production
- Executive producers: Tammy Chopling; Murray Ferguson
- Producer: Don Bell
- Production location: United Kingdom
- Running time: 60 minutes
- Production company: Clerkenwell Films

Original release
- Network: ITV
- Release: 24 September 2005 – 11 November 2006

Afterlife (stylised as afterlife) is a British mystery drama television series created by Stephen Volk. It follows university lecturer Robert Bridge (Andrew Lincoln) who becomes involved in a series of supernatural events surrounding medium Alison Mundy (Lesley Sharp). The series aired on ITV for two seasons from 24 September 2005 to 11 November 2006.

== Plot ==
The main characters of the programme are the psychic Alison Mundy (played by Lesley Sharp) and the academic who becomes involved with her due to his skeptical interest in the paranormal, Robert Bridge (Andrew Lincoln). Set in Bristol, each of the six one-hour episodes of the first series sees Alison become involved in the appearance of a spirit and attempting to discover why it has come back to haunt the living. Robert becomes involved in the first episode, when Alison first moves to Bristol and her activities inadvertently result in the suicide of one of his students.

Following this, Robert decides to study Alison for a book. Alison's interest in Robert stems from her ability to see the spirit of his young son, whom Robert cannot see. Throughout the series a recurring theme is Alison's attempt to have Robert fully come to terms with the death of his son so that the boy's spirit can be eased and he can fully move on. In the first series it is learnt that Alison was seriously injured in a train crash several years before. The other survivors of the train crash seek her out to contact their own lost loved ones in the final episode of the first series, almost causing Alison's own death. Later, in the second series, it is established that Alison had these powers since she was little, the first 'ghost' she saw was her grandfather. During the second series, Robert is diagnosed with cancer. He dies in the series finale, after having spent much of the series helping Alison to overcome mental problems brought about by the ghost of her mother. He also reconciles her with her father.

== Cast ==
Character	Actor	Years	Series	Episode count
Alison Mundy	Lesley Sharp	2005-2006	1.1–2.8	14
Robert Bridge	Andrew Lincoln	2005–2006	1.1–2.8	14
Barbara Sinyard	Kate Duchêne	2005–2006	1.1–2.8	13
Jude Bridge	Anna Wilson-Jones	2005-2006	1.1–2.8	13

== Production ==
The programme was created by experienced television scriptwriter Stephen Volk, much of whose previous work had involved the paranormal, most famously the 1992 Screen One play Ghostwatch for BBC One. Volk also wrote five of the six episodes of the first series, the exception being the fifth episode which was scripted by Charlie Fletcher. The producer was Murray Ferguson, and the directors were Maurice Phillips (episodes 1 & 2), Charles Beeson (episodes 3 & 6) and Martyn Friend (episodes 4 & 5). The second series was directed by Charles Beeson, Martyn Friend and Ashley Pearce. The episodes were written by Stephen Volk, Mark Greig, Guy Burt and Mike Cullen. The music for both series was composed by Edmund Butt.

Volk had originally conceived the series during the mid-1990s according to SFX magazine, when "ITV was fleetingly interested in producing a homegrown supernatural series because of The X-Files' success [in the UK]." The series remained unmade until Clerkenwell Films became interested, as did Lesley Sharp, the actress being very keen to star in the series. "She absolutely loved it and actually pestered ITV relentlessly, asking 'When are you gonna commission this series?' Eventually they did," Volk told SFX. Following the success of the first series, a second run was commissioned, beginning on 16 September 2006 on ITV in the UK. The first run has been released on DVD in the UK, including audio commentaries from the cast and crew. The first series began a repeat run on ITV in the UK on Sunday evenings from 9pm from 23 July, although this was quickly abandoned and the repeats moved across to the digital television channel ITV3.

== Critical reception ==
Previewing the first episode as one of "Today's Choices" for its day of transmission in the Radio Times listings magazine, television critic Alison Graham praised Afterlife as "[A] highly-promising mystery series... a taut and snappy spine-tingler, even if it does use some old-hat shocker techniques such as creaking floorboards, darkness, inexplicable noises and unexpected taps on the shoulder." Reviewing the same episode for The Guardian newspaper two days after its broadcast, critic Rupert Smith was also impressed: "What looked like being a deeply depressing hour was instantly enlivened by the appearance of Lesley Sharp, who has become in recent years television's favourite Everywoman... At last I can put my hand on my heart and give an unqualified cheer to a new primetime British drama series. Afterlife was scary without being over-gruesome, it kept a straight face while gleefully narrating a plot of pure old-fashioned hokum and it starred actors who are constantly, entirely watchable... Afterlife took the best bits of The X-Files, Jonathan Creek and, yes, Most Haunted, and turned them into terrific television."

The response remained positive through to the end of the series, with all subsequent episodes also being included in "Today's Choices" in the Radio Times. Previewing the sixth episode, Alison Graham was again positive, describing the series as a whole as having been "[A] consistently high-quality supernatural drama." Afterlife was also a success for ITV in terms of viewing figures. The first episode gathered an overnight average rating of 5.7 million, 25% of the total television audience for the time, winning its timeslot with nearly two million more viewers than the nearest competition on at the same time. The second episode improved to 6.2 million viewers, 29% of the available audience and again two million higher than its nearest competition on BBC One. Episode three gathered 5.4 million and a 25% share, which was identical to that gained by the BBC One competition (an edition of the semi-regular Test the Nation interactive quiz series). Viewing figures remained strong through to the final episode of the first series, which concluded the run by again winning its slot by two million viewers, with 5.8 million and a 28% audience share.

In April 2007 Afterlife received three nominations for the Monte Carlo Television Festival 2007. Lesley Sharp has been nominated as best actress, Andrew Lincoln as best actor and Murray Ferguson as best producer. Despite continued critical acclaim, a drop in ratings led ITV to pass on recommissioning the show for a third series.

== International broadcast ==
In addition to broadcasts in Australia and the United Kingdom, the series has also played in Canada on the BBC Canada cable television network. People+Arts, a cable television station for Latin America, broadcast the show in early 2006. It also aired in New Zealand on TV One in early 2006, and the first series played in Spain on Cuatro during August 2006. The program premiered in the US in November 2006 on BBC America; however, only the first series was shown.

It also aired in Sweden on TV4. Iceland's Stöð 2 broadcast the last episode of Series 2 in January 2007. In Poland Series 1 started airing in June 2007 on TVP1, and RTL Klub broadcast Series 2 beginning July 2007 in Hungary. In Hong Kong, the show played from May 2008. In The Netherlands VARA aired Series 1 in June and July 2008. In France it was broadcast from January 2009. Belgian TV station Canvas aired both series starting December 2008.

== Episode list ==
=== Series 1 (2005) ===
Episode	Title	Written by	Directed by	Original release date	Viewers (millions)
1	"More Than Meets the Eye"	Stephen Volk	Maurice Phillips	24 September 2005	6.00m
Alison tries to help a young girl, Veronica Vass, whose mother and father were killed in a suicide pact when she was just five years old. However, her tutor, Robert Bridge (Andrew Lincoln) is concerned that Alison's interfering is having a harmful effect on the girl's health. When Veronica has an out-of-body experience, imagining her parents death before her own eyes, the effects are enough for her to take her own life by slitting her wrists. Robert warns Alison to stay away from Veronica's family in the wake of her death.
2	"Lower Than Bones"	Stephen Volk	Maurice Phillips	1 October 2005	6.50m
Alison has visions of a young schoolgirl, Carly Tufnell, who has disappeared without trace, and tries to convince DI Felix George (Adrian Lester) that the girl is dead and has been buried in a water grave. Despite his initial misgivings, George acts on Alison's information and soon a body is found in a nearby wharf. With the help of Alison, George tries to gather evidence through Carly, and arrests a suspect (Daniel Flynn), but is soon forced to release him due to a lack of physical evidence to back up Alison's claims.
3	"Daniel One & Two"	Stephen Volk	Charles Beeson	8 October 2005	5.54m
Alison becomes involved with a young schizophrenic man, Daniel Rabey (Nicholas Shaw), in an attempt to discover whether he was truly responsible for a brutal assault on his girlfriend, or whether a spirit, known as 'Daniel Two', was the real attacker. Alison tries to discover exactly who 'Daniel Two' is, and why he has been haunting the frightened young man, but it is Daniel's mother (Saskia Reeves) who reveals that she believes the spirit may be that of an unborn child whom she aborted when she was just 19 years old.
4	"Misdirection"	Charlie Fletcher	Martyn Friend	15 October 2005	5.15m
Alison takes a job at a local care home, where resident nurse Connor (Mark Benton) is struggling to cope with the death of one of his patients, Ellen, who threw herself from a first floor window after expressing her wish to take her own life. Ellen continues to haunt Connor, until Alison discovers she is trying to lead him to a secret stash of items that have been disappearing from the home. Meanwhile, Robert is uncomfortable to discover that one of Alison's patients is in fact his own mother, Jenny (Rosemary Leach).
5	"Sleeping with the Dead"	Stephen Volk	Martyn Friend	22 October 2005	6.00m
Alison moves in with a young woman, Sandra (Nikki Amuka-Bird), who claims that her flat is being haunted by the spirits of former tenants. Alison discovers that the young female occupant was savagely murdered by her partner, after he suffocated her with a pillow, and Alison attempts to retrace the events leading up to the murder. However, when Sandra turns out to be a local journalist called Nichola who is writing a piece on how susceptible mediums can be, Alison and Robert realise they've been conned. At the end of the episode, unbeknownst to any of the characters, the couple Alison saw moves into the flat - it was a vision of the future, not the past.
6	"The 7:59 Club"	Stephen Volk	Charles Beeson	29 October 2005	5.91m
Alison decides to confront her own past by leading a séance to contact victims of the 7:59 from Manchester train crash in 1999, which left herself badly injured and many others dead. Robert is torn and is unsure whether or not he should support Alison, but eventually decides to attend the seance. Alison manages to make contact with the relatives of those at the seance table, until the seance goes badly wrong when she becomes inhabited by the spirit of Robert's dead son Josh, which causes her to enter into a coma.

=== Series 2 (2006) ===
Episode	Title	Written by	Directed by	Original release date	Viewers (millions)
1	"Roadside Bouquets"	Stephen Volk	Charles Beeson	16 September 2006	4.43m
Alison's first investigation following her recovery from the traumatic seance is the investigation into a fatal car crash which claimed a young woman's life. Her three friends believe they are being haunted by her spirit, suspecting that she is trying to send them a message after her friend Darren (Ed Westwick) placed her at the wheel of the crashed car to make out that she was the driver. Alison soon discovers that this is not the reason for their haunting, and that they themselves are spirits looking to be reunited.
2	"The Rat Man"	Stephen Volk	Charles Beeson	23 September 2006	4.42m
Alison and Robert investigate a series of suicides in a prison, but discover that a figure named 'The Rat Man' who has become friends with a dangerous inmate, Ian Garland (David Threlfall), is the cause of all of the recent deaths. Alison tries to work out whether The Rat Man has befriended Garland, or the other way around - and tries to discover what the secret behind their relationship is. Alison then has a visit from The Rat Man herself, which causes her to try and commit suicide - until Robert comes to her aid.
3	"Lullaby"	Mark Greig	Charles Beeson	30 September 2006	4.53
Alison comes to the aid of a young mother and father, Martin (Aidan McArdle) and Ruth (Zoe Telford), who believe they are hearing voices from the next life through their baby's safety monitor. Alison investigates and discovers that another baby previously died in the house, having been left to drown in the bath by its father, who also subsequently took his own life. Alison warns them that the man's spirit has returned to be re-united with his baby, but before they are able to move out, tragedy strikes.
4	"Your Hand in Mine"	Mike Cullen	Martyn Friend	7 October 2006	4.25m
Alison investigates when a young woman, Lucy (Julie Graham), begins to show symptoms of a contractive skin disease which caused the death of her fiancé Jonathan's (Liam Cunningham) first wife, Claire. Alison suspects that Claire is not at peace and attempts to discover the reason why Claire's spirit is stuck in limbo. Alison eventually discovers that Jonathan was not present at Claire's bedside when she died, and that all her spirit was looking to find was the final goodbye from Jonathan, which she never received.
5	"Mirrorball"	Mark Greig	Martyn Friend	21 October 2006	4.05m
Alison tries to help a young university student, Gemma Taylor (Natalia Tena), who is unable to get over the death of her best friend twelve months previously. When Gemma is haunted by the spirit of a young man who appears bruised and beaten, Alison tries to discover who he is and why his spirit has not passed over. Looking to Gemma for answers, Gemma reveals that the spirit was in fact her younger brother, who committed suicide after she convinced him that it was normal to have sexual relations with her.
6	"Mind the Bugs Don't Bite"	Stephen Volk	Martyn Friend	28 October 2006	3.96m
Alison tries to find out why the spirit of her own mother has not passed over. In an attempt to rebuild her broken family, Robert tries to track down her absent father (Kenneth Cranham and Craig Kelly). As Alison looks back on her own childhood, she realises that unbeknown to the rest of her family, she was the first person to find her mother after she committed suicide - and that her failure to act has led her mother's spirit to come back and haunt her until she reveals the truth as to what really happened that day.
7	"Things Forgotten"	Guy Burt	Ashley Pearce	4 November 2006	4.08m
Alison investigates when a teenager, who is being haunted by the spirit of a masked boy, comes to her after his regular medium, Jennifer (Claire Rushbrook), is unable to make peace with the spirit. However, Alison is also unable to connect with the spirit, leaving Robert to try and identify who the spirit is and what it wants from the young boy. When the boy finally realises that the spirit is a younger version of himself, a tirade of abuse comes to light, allowing the spirit to finally rest in peace. Robert resolves to not finish the psychological report about Alison that Robert has been writing in past episodes. He puts his written work in an envelope and goes to Alison's place to give the unfinished report to her, but he collapses at a railway station prior to reaching her house.
8	"A Name Written in Water"	Stephen Volk	Ashley Pearce	11 November 2006	4.62m
Alison launches a frantic search when Robert's spirit comes to her in a vision, but fears her efforts are too late when she discovers that he has been admitted to intensive care, unaware of the fact he has a brain tumour. Whilst at Robert's bedside, Alison has visions of the spirit of a night-nurse (Aislinn Sands) who comes to greet people seconds after they die. Alison tries to work out what she wants and tries to prevent her from taking Robert into the next life, even offering herself as a sacrifice to save Robert's life. The next day Alison visits Robert in intensive care. In the same room, Robert, as a spirit, stands next to her and asks her help, because he is scared of dying. He explains that everything he loves is where he lives. At first, she tells him that she cannot help him, because she does not want him to die. Robert asks her questions about his body and what will happen after he dies. Alison explains that Robert is out of his own body and is now free, and Robert feels better. The night-nurse reappears, and Robert dies. After Alison walks out of the intensive care unit, she sees Robert walking down the same corridor, ahead of her, towards light. Alison sees Robert reuniting with his dead son; after they embrace, they walk into the light together.
