= By Design =

- Directed by: Claude Jutra
- Screenplay by: Claude Jutra; Joe Wiesenfeld; David Eames
- Produced by: Beryl Fox; Werner Aellen
- Starring: Sara Botsford; Patty Duke; Clare Coulter; Saul Rubinek
- Cinematography: Jean Boffety
- Edited by: Toni Trow; Ralph Rosenblum
- Music by: Chico Hamilton
- Production companies: B.D.F. Productions; Canadian Film Development Corporation; Fox Productions; Seven Arts
- Distributed by: Astral Films (Canada); Atlantic Releasing Corporation (US)
- Release date: May 8, 1982
- Running time: 92 minutes
- Country: Canada
- Language: English

By Design is a 1982 Canadian comedy-drama film directed by Claude Jutra and starring Sara Botsford and Patty Duke. The film was produced by B.D.F. Productions, Canadian Film Development Corporation (CFDC), Fox Productions, and Seven Arts.

== Synopsis ==
Angie and Helen are in love and they live and work together - they design women's clothes and run their own fashion business in Vancouver. Helen wants to be a mother. Angie loves Helen and if Helen cannot feel fulfilled without a child she is willing for them to become parents. When Helen announces she wants to have a child, Angie reluctantly agrees to support her. The only obstacle seems to be the physical factor, at first, an idea of artificial insemination came to their mind. However, "They then quickly reject the idea of artificial insemination when they see an unkempt drunk emerging from the cubicle where he has donated sperm for beer money." "Denied permission to adopt, and rejecting artificial insemination, the couple set their sights on sleazy photographer, Terry, as a potential one-night stand for Helen." At the end of the film, Angie gives birth to a girl, while Suzie and Terry move to Los Angeles to promote their new design.

== Cast ==
- Patty Duke as Helen (as Patty Duke Astin).
- Anya Best as Pineapple
- Sara Botsford as Angie
- Patricia Best as Pineapple's Mother
- Saul Rubinek as Terry
- Jan Filips as Paul
- Sonia Zimmer as Suzie
- Joe Flaherty as Veteran Father
- Mina E. Mina as R.B. Corcoran
- William Samples as Insemination
- Alan Duruisseau as Sven
- James Hibbard as Carl (as Jim Hibbard)
- Clare Coulter as Ms. Hirshorn
- Ralph Benmergui as Mannequin Dresser
- Robert Benson as Henri
- Steve Witkin as Mannequin Dresser
- Jeannie Elias as Cowgirl
- Nabuko Hardychuck as Mo
- Scott Swanson as Mr. Potter
- Bill Reiter as Construction Foreman
- Robin McCullough as Server in the Cafeteria
- Andrea Olch as Baby Angie
- Maria West as Secretary
- Don Granbery as Butler

== Development ==
While Jutra was directing this movie, he received an offer by Beryl Fox to direct the movie Surfacing. Initially rejected this offer, he changed his mind until "Fox agreed to produce By Design as well. Although a script existed before Jutra became involved with the project, he was able to rewrite it thoroughly in collaboration with playwright Joe Wiesenfeld."

== Reception ==
The film was favourably reviewed by the critic Pauline Kael in The New Yorker : " a buoyant, quirky sex comedy..the director takes a look around the whole modern supermarket of sex. By Design takes in the bars and beach houses, fast food restaurants and discos, and the sexual patterns of those who inhabit them..Jutra has a light understated approach to farce. His sensibility suggests a mingling of Tati and Truffaut. The scenes are quick and they're dippy, but with a pensive, melancholy underlay."

Conversely, Philip Szporer of The Cinema Canada journal published a lengthy film review in January 1983, concluding that "If the film was to have been a bold, inventive, humorous and touching tale, it is instead a completely forgettable experience. Lacking a coherent structure and tone, the film only serves up a mish-mash of moral overtones and misgivings.""

== Awards ==
All four of the film's stars received Genie Award nominations at the 4th Genie Awards: Rubinek as Best Actor, Botsford as Best Actress, Coulter as Best Supporting Actress and Astin as Foreign Actress.
