= Murder by Phone =

1982 film directed by Michael Anderson

- US theatrical release poster
- Directed by: Michael Anderson
- Screenplay by: Michael Butler; Dennis Shryack; John Kent Harrison
- Story by: George Armondo; James Whiton; Michael Butler; Dennis Shryack
- Produced by: Bob Cooper
- Starring: Richard Chamberlain; John Houseman; Sara Botsford; Robin Gammell; Gary Reineke; Barry Morse
- Cinematography: Reginald H. Morris
- Music by: John Barry
- Production company: Coco Films; Famous Players; CFDC
- Distributed by: Astral Films (Canada); New World Pictures (US)
- Release dates: May 27, 1982 (Colombia); October 8, 1982 (US & Canada)
- Running time: 89 minutes
- Countries: Canada; United States
- Language: English

Murder by Phone (also released as Bells and The Calling) is a 1982 science-fiction slasher film directed by Michael Anderson and starring Richard Chamberlain, John Houseman, Sara Botsford, Robin Gammell, Gary Reineke and Barry Morse. Its plot follows a series of murders committed by a mysterious person on the opposite end of the line who triggers a device that kills victims when they answer their telephones.

== Plot ==
The movie begins with a woman hearing a phone ring at a subway train and goes to the public phone booth to answer it. She hears nothing at first until high pitched beeping sounds slowly climb up, which makes the woman shake vibrantly and make her eyes bleed and is then thrown onto the escalator due to the explosion that sounded like thunder.

Nat Bridger, an ecology professor, goes to the Thorner home after teaching his class. Thorner and his wife can't handle the fact that their daughter, Sandra, is dead (the woman from the opening scene) after her murder. Later that night, a businessman, Gordon Smith is later electrocuted by the phone he was using when it ringed and was thrown out through the large glass window and crashes onto a car and was killed.

The next day, Nat goes for a ceremony and gets called for the letter of authorization to send to the caller. He goes to see Lt. Merra when he finds out that Sandra's death was caused for a heart attack. Then Nat stays over at Stanley Markowitz place and interviews a lady who had witnessed the murder. Later that night, Mrs. Andersen gets killed by the phone.

Nat tries to figure out why the phone at the subway was repaired and gets rejected at first then gets to talk to the supervisor at a business industry. He met Ridley Taylor inside not so long ago after a talk with the supervisor and invites her to dinner. And another phone gone wrong happened at Connie Lawson and was killed.

Later the next day, Nat gets into an argument with Meara for not helping him on the case. Nat gets followed by a tourist guy who takes pictures and thinks he's working for someone but gets pulled away. After being arrested and healed by Stanley, Nat goes to the phone control center to search for evidence that can led to the mystery and finds pairs of phones that were used for the murders. After Nat has arrived at Ridley's house, Stanley gets murdered by the phone.

Nat and Meara go to the commissioner about Stanley's discussion on the phone murders and gets called out. Nat goes to Stanley's house for evidence until he realizes that from the video tape player, an address that led to Ridley's house and plays the tape at Ridley's house realizing that Noah Clayton, the tour guide, must be the phone operator, killing people by the use of a phone. After Nat leaves, Ridley gets a phone call from Noah and before he can kill her through the phone, Ridley throws it away, not getting killed.

Nat and other men, along with Ridley, go to the Power company for clues and Nat gets the phone call from Clayton, revealing his innovations for killing people through phones for revenge over perceived injustices. Before he kills Nat, the deadly high-frequency sonic pulse he designed for his telephone murders is reversed and sent back through the line, causing Clayton to convulse and a shelf behind him falls on him and is killed.

The movie ends with the whole mystery solved and Nat gets a call from Al Histlip, the public safety department of the city, congrates him for solving the phone murders and as Ridley leaves to go home, Nat calls out "I'll call you" before the high pitch beeping noises come again and the movie cuts out to the credits.

== Cast ==
- Richard Chamberlain as Nat Bridger
- John Houseman as Stanley Markowitz
- Sara Botsford as Ridley Taylor
- Robin Gammell as Noah Clayton
- Gary Reineke as Lt. Meara
- Barry Morse as Fred Waites
- Alan Scarfe as John Websole
- James B. Douglas as Jack Gilsdorf
- Ken Pogue as Fil Thorner
- Neil Munro as Winters
- Tom Butler as Detective Tamblyn
- Ian D. Clark as First Cop
- Colin Fox as Dr. Leon Alderman
- Jefferson Mappin as Alex
- Luba Goy as Beth Freemantle
- Lenore Zann as Connie Lawson
- George R. Robertson as George Lord
- Jo-Anne Hannah as Sandra Thorner
- Duncan McIntosh as Dave Misner
- Martha Gibson as Mrs. Andersen
- Angus MacInnes as Lab Guard
- Elva Mai Hoover as Phone Woman
- Neil Affleck as Phone Tracer

== Novel ==
The movie was preceded by a novel called Phone Call written by the screenwriters Michael Butler and Dennis Shryack by author Jon Messman. It was published in 1979, three years before the film version. It is never credited in the film's credits. The link was mentioned on the cover in later editions of the book.

== Production ==
The film was filmed in 1980 in Toronto, Ontario. The working title of the film was Bells, which appeared on early promotional material, but it was changed to Murder by Phone before it was released in some markets. It was released as Bells in the United Kingdom.

=== Music ===
The score by John Barry is electronic, played entirely with synthesisers. This was a rarity for Barry. Whilst he composed and conducted the score, it was performed by Jonathan Elias and John Petersen. Elias later went on to work with Barry on the scores for Jagged Edge and A View to a Kill.

== Release ==
Murder by Phone was first released in Colombia on May 27, 1982. It released in Canada and the United States on October 8, 1982. (Note: The earliest newspaper sources displaying showtimes for the film are dated for the weekend of October 8—10, 1982.)

=== Critical response ===
Leonard Maltin noted the film's cast and direction as being legitimately "talented," but deemed the film a "hoary horror exercise."

=== Home media ===
Murder by Phone was released on VHS by Warner Home Video in 1984. The VHS was reissued in 1998.

== Works cited ==
- Fischer, Dennis (2011). Science Fiction Film Directors, 1895–1998. Jefferson, North Carolina: McFarland. ISBN 978-0-786-48505-5.
- Maltin, Leonard (2009). Leonard Maltin's Movie and Video Guide. New American Library. ISBN 978-0-451-22468-2.
- Muir, John Kenneth (2011). Horror Films of the 1980s. Jefferson, North Carolina: McFarland. ISBN 978-0-7864-5501-0.
