= Disguise (novel) =

2008 novel by Hugo Hamilton

- Author: Hugo Hamilton
- Language: English
- Genre: Novel
- Publisher: Fourth Estate
- Publication date: June 6, 2008
- Publication place: Ireland
- Media type: Print (Paperback)
- Pages: 261 pp
- ISBN: 0-00-719216-9
- OCLC: 225421420
- Dewey Decimal: 823.914 22
- LC Class: PR6058.A5526 D57 2008

Disguise is a 2008 novel by the Irish writer Hugo Hamilton set in Germany.

== Synopsis ==
The book begins during the Battle of Berlin. A mother, Mrs Liedmann and her son are living in a house in the city. Her husband is fighting for the German forces on the Western front. A bomb falls on their house and kills her son Gregor. Distraught, she searches among the ruins for her son. Her father, Emil Liedmann, who is a deserter from the army, comes to take her home To Nuremberg. On the outskirts of a country town he finds an orphan boy the same age as Gregor and makes his daughter promise to raise him as her own child and never to tell a soul that he is not her son. Soon after Emil disappears while searching for fuel on the black market. Later it emerges that Emil was shot by American forces as he tried to escape the Germans, who wanted to capture and punish Emil for being a deserter.

In autumn 2006 a grown up Gregor meets with friends and family in an orchard in the German countryside. Gregor meets his wife Mara, from whom he has bees separated for thirty or so years, his best friend Martin and his son Daniel who is with his girlfriend Juli. Over the day spent picking apples Gregor reminisces over his life. In his teenage years he began to suspect that he was not his parents child, given that he looked nothing like them and on account of a slip up made by Uncle Max, an old friend of Emil. He runs away and travels throughout Europe for several years, returning to Germany intermittently to earn money for his travels. By the late sixties he is in Berlin and working as a musician. He meets Martin and Mara, telling them that he is an orphan. After some years he marries Mara when she becomes pregnant. The couples relationship comes under strain however when Mara visits Mrs. Liedmann who insists that Gregor is her biological dad. forced to choose between the word of her husband or his mother she becomes confused. Gregor decides to leave for a while to travel to Toronto with a group of musicians. Gregor maintains a long distance relationship with his family. After a time he returns to Berlin but finds it too hard. He leaves for Ireland where he lives for several years before he returns to Berlin following the fall of the Berlin Wall. As time passes he gradually sees more of Mara and the two reform their friendship. At the end of the book, after Daniel has blamed Gregor for having fabricated the story of his existence, Mara takes the pair to a room in the back of the farmhouse where they are staying. In it is all of the possessions of Gregor's childhood home. Mara finds the clothes in which Gregor was found as a boy. Mara theorises that Mrs. Liedmann kept the clothes to let Gregor know of his origins. After this Daniel believes his fathers story.
