= The New Worst Witch =

British television series

- Genre: Children's; Fantasy; Magic
- Based on: The Worst Witch by Jill Murphy
- Directed by: Andrew Gunn
- Starring: Anabel Barnston; Alice Connor; Caroline O'Neill; Clare Coulter; Francesca Isherwood
- Theme music composer: Anthony Flynn
- Opening theme: Theme
- Composer: Anthony Flynn
- Countries of origin: United Kingdom; Canada
- Original language: English
- No. of seasons: 2
- No. of episodes: 26

Production
- Production location: Clitheroe Castle (exterior scenes)
- Production company: Granada Kids

Original release
- Network: ITV (CITV)
- Release: 5 January 2005 – 27 January 2007

Related
- Weirdsister College (2001); The Worst Witch (1986); The Worst Witch (1998–2001); The Worst Witch (2017–2020)

The New Worst Witch is a television series based on Jill Murphy's The Worst Witch books about a group of young witches at a Witch Academy. It ran for two series from 2005 to 2007. The series is a spin-off from The Worst Witch TV series that ran from 1998 to 2001 and follows the show's first spin-off Weirdsister College.

The series follows Henrietta "Hettie" Hubble (Mildred's younger cousin), through her years at Cackle's Academy. Mildred is seen at the start of the first episode riding her cousin's broom close to Cackle's and she then disappears. Hettie quickly becomes best friends with Mona Hallow (who happens to be Ethel's younger sister) and Crescentmoon "Cressie" Winterchild. Hettie and her friends' new enemy is Belladonna Bindweed and her sidekick Cynthia Horrocks. Miss Hardbroom and Miss Cackle return, and are joined by new members of staff Caspian Bloom, Miss Swoop, and Miss Widget/Miss Nightingale.

The New Worst Witch was initially planned to have a third season in 2007, but Alice Connor who played Henrietta Hubble in the series along with several other cast members decided not to sign onto the third season and thus was subsequently canceled the same year.

During November 2009, CITV showed all episodes of The New Worst Witch.

== Characters ==
Students

- Henrietta "Hettie" Hubble – The protagonist of the series. Similar to her older cousin Mildred when she was at Cackle's, Hettie always ends up getting in trouble due to her scheming. She is best friends with Mona and Cressie, and sort-of friends with Dyllis and Roseanne. She is enemies with Belladonna and Cynthia and does not usually get along with the teachers, particularly Miss Hardbroom. Hettie is portrayed by Alice Connor.
- Mona Hallow – Hettie's best friend and student in her class. Mona is the cleverest in the year, and does all she can to ensure best possible grades. She is also the scientist of the group, and puts these skills to the test when helping Hettie get out of trouble. Mona is friends with both Hettie and Cressie, and enemies with Belladonna, and especially Cynthia. Mona is portrayed by Anabel Barnston
- Crescentmoon "Cressie" Winterchild – Hettie's best friend and a student in her class. Cressie is a Hedge Witch, meaning she must follow their traditions and rituals. She is also found out to be a Time Witch, meaning she can manipulate time itself. Cressie is best friends with Mona and Hettie, and enemies with Belladonna and Cynthia. Paislie Reid portays Cressie.
- Belladonna Bindweed – Hettie, Mona, and Cressie's enemy and student in their class. Belladonna is stuck-up, rude and unkind towards the three of them. In Season One, she is liked by the teachers, despite her ways towards fellow students. She is often the one calling the teachers and making sure Hettie gets in trouble. Her sidekick and friend is Cynthia Horrocks, and Belladonna and her have a mutual dislike towards Mona, Cressie, and Hettie. Belladonna's granny is Betty Bindweed, who tried to take over the school along with Miss Cackle's evil twin sister Agatha. Belladonna is played by Francesca Isherwood
- Cynthia Horrocks – Cynthia is Belladonna's sidekick and often follows her around. She does not like Hettie and Cressie, however takes an even bigger dislike towards Mona, due to Mona's father shutting down the factory that her father works at. Cynthia is often known by her surname Horrocks. She is played by Daisy Hughes.
- Dyllis Mustardseed – Dyllis is a student in Hettie's class known as the least popular of the students and is usually looking for a friend out of Hettie, Mona and Cressie, and even Belladonna at times. She is played by Narisha Lawson.
- Roseanne Speedwell – A student in Hettie's class who is often clumsy. Roseanne is also a cheerleader. She is played by Dominique Jackson.

Teachers

- Miss Amelia Cackle – Miss Cackle is the Headmistress of Cackle's Academy. She is usually kind-hearted towards the students. She has a passion for teaching magic, particularly spells. She is a Time Witch, meaning she can manipulate time itself. Miss Cackle also adores cream cakes, which she is well known for by other staff. Miss Cackle is played by Genie Nominated Canadian actress Clare Coulter. Coulter also played Miss Cackle in the original series The Worst Witch and is the only full-time cast member to appear in both adaptations.
- Miss Constance Hardbroom – Miss Hardbroom is the Deputy Headmistress & Potions Teacher at Cackle's Academy. She is strict and staunch, and loves to implement discipline at every opportunity. Miss Hardbroom is particularly harsh towards Hettie, likely due to her connection with Mildred who previously attended the school during The Worst Witch. Miss Hardbroom is played by Caroline O'Neill. O'Neill replaced Kate Duchêne who played Miss Hardbroom in the original series.
- Miss Deidre Swoop – Miss Swoop is the P.E Teacher at the academy. She is nervous and wanting to impress the other staff, particularly Miss Hardbroom, due to her being new to teaching. She owns a pet owl, which gets inspected when the animal inspector visits the school. Miss Swoop is played by Stephanie Lane. Lane is the only actress to appear in all three adaptations of the show in a main role. She appeared as a young Deidre Swoop in the original series, then appeared as an older student in the first-spin off Weirdsister College, and then appeared as a teacher in this adaptation.
- Miss Nightingale – Miss Nightingale is the Art Teacher at the academy. She is passionate about the subject and wants to instill a love of Art into her students, with creativity. Miss Nightingale is often the first one to back up Hettie, and has frequent arguments with Miss Hardbroom. Miss Nightingale is played by Indra Ové.
- Miss Myrtle Widget – Miss Widget replaces Miss Nightingale and becomes the new Art Teacher in Season Two of the show. She is very eager about Art and all of its connotations. She is very jubilant and vibrant, even more than her predecessor. Miss Widget becomes good friends with Miss Swoop, who often tells her secrets, including her crush on the inspector. Miss Widget is played by Elizabeth Bower. Bower won the Edinburgh Fringe Report Award partly due to her portrayal of Miss Widget in the show.
- Mr Caspian Bloom – Mr Bloom is the librarian and Wizard in residence of the academy. He loves jam doughnuts, which he often gets bribed into doing things, for. He is the oldest staff member, and often sleeps on his desk. Bloom is a very talented magician, and made Belladonna not be able to see when she annoyed him. Under the influence of a love potion, both Miss Widget and Miss Swoop fall in love with him in the final episode of the series. Mr Bloom is played by Ian Lindsay.

== Episodes ==
=== Series overview ===
Series	Episodes	Originally released	
Series	Episodes	First released	Last released
1	13	5 January 2005	14 October 2005
2	13	20 October 2006	27 January 2007

=== Series 1 (2005) ===
No. overall	No. in series	Title	Original release date
1	1	"Give a Witch a Bad Name"	5 January 2005
Henrietta Hubble is all set to start her first year at Cackle's Academy for Witches, but is determined to make a good impression. Things, as they usually did for her cousin Mildred, go badly wrong. Mildred is seen dropping Hettie off at school, now an accomplished witch. After a disastrous start to school and a run-in with Belladonna Bindweed, Hettie makes friends with Ethel Hallow's sister, Mona and Crescent-Moon "Cressie" Winterchild, a member of the "Hedge Witch Community".
2	2	"The Confidence Trick"	10 January 2005
It is the Broomstick Aptitude Test and Hettie passes with flying colours, but Cressie fails. Hettie begs Miss Cackle to give her a second chance, like she did with Mildred, and Hettie and Mona concoct a plan to make sure she passes.
3	3	"Rules Rules Rules"	17 January 2005
Hettie is sick of all the rules at Cackle's so starts a petition to change them. Miss Cackle grants Hettie's wish and decides to let the school abide by Hettie's rules for a day, much to the shock and dismay of Miss Hardbroom.
4	4	"No Place Like Home"	24 January 2005
Cressie is missing home, so Hettie tries to cheer her up. A new girl arrives on a Charity Scholarship, Cynthia Horrocks and immediately makes an enemy out of Mona. This is because Mona's dad took over Cynthia's dad's factory and she was forced to leave Pentangle's and go to Cackle's.
5	5	"Trick or Treat"	31 January 2005
It is Halloween and Hettie, Mona and Cressie have been selected by Miss Nightingale to sing to the Grand Wizard. It turns out, the Grand Wizard is ill, so his place is taken by wizard author Richard Avalon. Hettie gets into trouble while trying to prove a point and is replaced by Belladonna to sing in the ceremony. Hettie decides she must prove who Richard Avalon really is.
6	6	"Truth or Lies"	7 February 2005
When a forbidden spell book goes missing from the library, all privileges are cut off until the book is returned and the culprit owns up. All signs point to Hettie, but she and her friends set out to clear her name.
7	7	"Deadly Doubles"	2 September 2005
To celebrate the school's birthday, the school has a "Witch-themed Olympics" and put into teams. After an argument between Hettie and Belladonna, Miss Cackle puts the two in a team.
8	8	"The Levitating Boomerang Broomstick"	9 September 2005
Hettie accidentally does a very famous broomstick trick while trying out for the Open Day Broom Formation. She takes all the glory, but then is thrown in the deep when Miss Cackle and Miss Hardbroom decide to drop the broom formation and expect Hettie to perform the trick for Open Day and in front of the last witch to do the trick, Araminta Hexley-Gore.
9	9	"The Visitors"	16 September 2005
Pentangle's School is forced to share with Cackle's after their school floods, causing fights between the two schools.
10	10	"The Bewitching of Mona Hallow"	23 September 2005
It's Hazlemass, a special Hedge Witch ceremony, but to Cressie's disappointment, Miss Hardbroom tells her that Cackle's does not celebrate Hazlemass. Hettie and Mona decide to help Cressie celebrate it anyway, but when the girls leave the celebration cake unattended, Belladonna puts a bewitching spell on it. Mona persuades the others that she can look after the cake without touching it. She just has a taste and immediately becomes enemies with Hettie and Cressie.
11	11	"The Black Hole Club"	30 September 2005
Hettie rediscovers the "Black Hole Club" and Belladonna and Cynthia push their way in, to the dismay of Hettie, Mona and Cressie. Belladonna causes chaos with the Book of Trivial Magic and soon things become desperate.
12	12	"Time After Time"	7 October 2005
Cressie discovers she is a Time Witch, a witch that can tamper with time, so Hettie pressures her to go back in time with her to patch a falling out with Mona.
13	13	"The Enemy Within"	14 October 2005
Belladonna's granny Bindweed and Miss Cackle's twin, Agatha try to take over the school yet again by using the End of Term prize, the very powerful Golden Broomstick.

=== Series 2 (2006–2007) ===
No. overall	No. in series	Title	Original release date
14	1	"The Curse of Cackle's"	20 October 2006
It is the anniversary of Cackle's and while under the influence of a potion, Hettie sets to fulfil a curse that will destroy the school.
15	2	"Lost and Found"	27 October 2006
Hettie uses trivial magic to bring her dog Kitty back when he is lost, but causes havoc when everything lost comes back.
16	3	"Girls Will Be Boys"	3 November 2006
Miss Hardbroom's nephew, Artemis, is staying at Cackle's to study for the "Wiz of the Year" Competition. Mona has also entered the competition, but Artemis tells her it is only for boys, so he and Hettie turn Mona into a boy.
17	4	"Next Week’s News"	10 November 2006
Hettie, Mona and Cressie find an old printing press and start a newspaper. They improvise some of the stories, unaware that the press makes the stories come true, which means Belladonna has a wart on her nose, Miss Cackle writes poems and Miss Hardbroom is going to be eaten by a giant owl.
18	5	"The Big Sleep"	17 November 2006
The teachers are put to sleep while a big inspection is going on, so Miss Swoop, the only teacher who didn't drink the sleeping potion, steps in to save the day.
19	6	"Back to Basics"	24 November 2006
The school goes back to basics and cancels their factory-made potion ingredients so the girls can get a taste of being "real witches".
20	7	"The Friendship Test"	1 December 2006
It is Cressie's Hedge Witch training course and she must become friends with her enemy.
21	8	"King Kong Kittie"	8 December 2006
The animal inspector comes to inspect the girls' cats, Miss Swoop's owl and Hettie's dog, but Belladonna puts a spell on Hettie's dog, Kitty to make him bigger than the castle.
22	9	"The Wish Wimble"	15 December 2006
Every seven years, there is supposedly a magic wishing well that will grant any wish written on a pebble thrown into the well, but Miss Cackle and Hettie get their wires crossed and as usual Hettie tries to save the day.
23	10	"Hettie's Final Warning"	6 January 2007
Hettie is put on a final warning, so she takes an obedience potion. Belladonna and Cynthia find this out so use it to get Hettie expelled. Mona and Cressie work on a plan to get her reinstated.
24	11	"Mr Perky Pentangle"	13 January 2007
The Pentangle's Owl goes missing and Miss Pentangle visits Cackle's to the school of stealing the owl as a form of school rivalry.
25	12	"Saturday Witch Fever"	20 January 2007
The school organises a trip to a theme park but Miss Cackle comes down with what everyone thinks is Witch Fever.
26	13	"The Odd Couple"	27 January 2007
Hettie explodes a grape in Cressie's room so all girls on Cressie's wing must share with the other girls. Mona must share with Belladonna, but they have disagreements over the rules and Cressie stays with Hettie, but Cressie is a snorer. Hettie sings a lullaby to her to cure her, but gets the words wrong and turns Cressie back into a baby. Meanwhile, there is love blooming in the staff room thanks to Mona Hallow.

== Cancellation ==
In 2006, Alice Connor who played Henrietta Hubble decided not to renew her contract for a third series as well as a few other cast members as they began to age and they were becoming more interested in pursuing other roles despite the series being expected to return.
