= List of fictional witches =

This is a list of witches that appear in notable works of fiction, including novels, stories, films, TV series, animations, video games, comics, and other works.

== Comics ==
A

- Adrazelle (Mélusine)
- Alwina (Good witch in the Suske en Wiske story "Het Spaanse Spook")
- Alwina (Evil witch in the Suske en Wiske story "De Schat van Beersel")
- Antanneke (Witch in the Suske en Wiske story "De Zeven Snaren")
- Arba (Groo the Wanderer)

B

- Queen Beryl (Sailor Moon)
- Broom-Hilda (Broom-Hilda)

C

- Queen Candy (Sugar Sugar Rune)
- Circe (DC Comics)
- Cassandra (Sabrina's Secret Life)

D

- Dakarba (Groo the Wanderer)
- Della (Sabrina the Teenage Witch)
- Magica DeSpell (various Donald Duck comics)
- Minima DeSpell (various Donald Duck comics)
- Draculaura (Monster High, 2022 version only)

E

- Edwina (Maria the Virgin Witch)
- Enchantra (Sabrina the Teenage Witch)
- Enchantress (DC Comics)
- Enchantress (Marvel Comics)
- Esmeralda (Sabrina the Teenage Witch)
- Eucalypta (Paulus the woodgnome)

F

- Flodderbes (De Geuzen)
- Eruka Frog (Soul Eater)

G

- Galiena (Sabrina the Teenage Witch)
- Grandmama (The Addams Family)
- Grotbags (Grotbags)
- Violet Grimm (Dogwitch)
- Arachne Gorgon (Soul Eater)
- Medusa Gorgon (Soul Eater)
- Shaula Gorgon (Soul Eater Not!)

H

- Haakneus (Jommeke, Met Langteen en Schommelbuik Voorwaarts)
- Theo Hag (Fawcett Comics)
- Agatha Harkness (Marvel Comics)
- Hela de Heks (The Adventures of Nero)
- Helen (Kiff)

K

- Jennifer Kale (Marvel Comics)
- Karnilla (Marvel Comics)
- Kinetix (DC Comics)
- Kovertol (Evil witch in the Suske en Wiske story De Tuf-Tuf-Club)

L

- Angela Leon (Soul Eater)
- Laverna (Barbie: Fairytopia trilogy)
- Lydia (Barbie and the Diamond Castle)

M

- Mabaa (Soul Eater)
- Mad Hettie (The Sandman)
- The Mad Mod Witch (The Unexpected)
- Amy Madison (Buffy the Vampire Slayer)
- Maghella (Maghella)
- Magik (Marvel Comics)
- Malicella (Mélusine)
- Maria (Maria the Virgin Witch)
- Tara MacLay (Buffy the Vampire Slayer)
- Miki Makimura (Devilman Grimoire)
- Madam Mim (Disney Comics)
- Chocolat Meilleure (Sugar Sugar Rune)
- Cinnamon Meilleure (Sugar Sugar Rune)
- Mélusine (Mélusine)
- Vanilla Mieux (Sugar Sugar Rune)
- Nico Minoru (Runaways)
- The Mizune Sisters (Soul Eater)
- Morgaine le Fey (DC Comics)
- Morgan le Fey (Marvel Comics)
- Ms. Mystic (Pacific Comics)

N

- Lucinda Nightbane (Princess Lucinda)
- Millicent Nightbane (Princess Lucinda)
- Nyx (Image Comics)

O

- Old Witch (One of the mascots of EC Comics' The Haunt of Fear series)

P

- Pierehaar (Jommeke, Met Langteen en Schommelbuik Voorwaarts)

Q

- Queen of Fables (DC Comics)

R

- Roberta (Topolino, an Italian Disney comic series)
- Romilda (Yra)
- Rosalind (Sabrina the Teenage Witch)
- Willow Rosenberg (Buffy the Vampire Slayer)

S

- Salem's Seven (Marvel Comics)
- Satana (Marvel Comics)
- The Scarlet Witch (Marvel Comics)
- Schierke (Berserk)
- Sea Hag (Popeye)
- Amanda Sefton (Marvel Comics)
- Queen Seles (Sabrina the Teenage Witch)
- LLandra da Silva (Sabrina the Teenage Witch)
- Sindella (DC Comics)
- Hilda Spellman (Sabrina the Teenage Witch)
- Sabrina Spellman (Sabrina the Teenage Witch)
- Zelda Spellman (Sabrina the Teenage Witch)
- Steketand (Jommeke, Met Langteen en Schommelbuik Voorwaarts)
- Strega (DC Comics)
- Margali Szardos (Marvel Comics)

T

- Tarot (Tarot: Witch of the Black Rose)
- Thessaly (The Sandman)
- The Three (The Witching Hour, The Sandman)
- Traci Thirteen (DC Comics)
- Topaz (Marvel Comics)
- Frau Totenkinder (Fables)

V

- Viv (Maria the Virgin Witch)

W

- Waffle (Sugar Sugar Rune)
- Wendy the Good Little Witch (Harvey Comics)
- White Witch (DC Comics)
- Winnie the Witch (Winnie the Witch)
- Witchfire (DC Comics)
- Witchfire (Marvel Comics)
- Wizadora
- Wredulia (Douwe Dabbert)

X

- Madame Xanadu (DC Comics)

Z

- Zatanna Zatara (DC Comics)
- De Zwarte Madam (Suske en Wiske)

== Literary ==
A

- Hannah Abbott (Harry Potter)
- Sarah "Granny" Aching (Discworld)
- Tiffany Aching (Discworld)
- Thais Allard (Balefire)
- Wisteria Allgood (Witch and Wizard series)
- Jaenelle Angelline (Black Jewels Trilogy)
- Anguanes (Monster Allergy)
- Deborah Armstrong (The Secret Circle)
- Nick Armstrong (The Secret Circle)

B

- Miss Davina Bat (The Worst Witch)
- Bathilda Bagshot (Harry Potter)
- Jean-Baptiste Mésomier (Witches of East End/Summer on East End Series)
- Anne Barklay (Witches of East End Series)
- Camryn Alicia Barnes (Twitches)
- Arthur Beauchamp (Witches of East End/Wolf Pact/Blue Bloods Series)
- Freya Beauchamp (Witches of East End/Summer on East End Series)
- Ingrid Beauchamp (Witches of East End/Summer on East End Series)
- Gammer Beavis (Discworld)
- Joanna Beauchamp (Witches of East End)
- Katie Bell (Harry Potter)
- Diana Bishop (A Discovery of Witches)
- Walburga Black (Harry Potter)
- Gwinifer Blackcap (Discworld)
- Griselda Blackwood (The Worst Witch)
- Cal Blaire (Sweep)
- Cassie Blake (The Secret Circle)
- Amelia Bones (Harry Potter)
- Susan Bones (Harry Potter)
- The Broom Witch (Ophelia Learns to Swim)
- The Beldam/The Other Mother (Coraline)
- Mr. Brooks (Discworld)
- Lavender Brown (Harry Potter)
- Stacey Brown (Blue Is for Nightmares)
- Millicent Bulstrode (Harry Potter)
- Charity Burbage (Harry Potter)

C

- Agatha Cackle (The Worst Witch)
- Miss Amelia Cackle (The Worst Witch)
- Miss Cambric (Discworld)
- Mrs. Cantrip (Carbonel)
- Mary Cattermole (Harry Potter)
- Alecto Carrow (Harry Potter)
- Minnie Castavet (Rosemary's Baby)
- Faye Chamberlain (The Secret Circle)
- Cho Chang (Harry Potter)
- Adriane Charday (Avalon: Web of Magic)
- Letitia de Chumsfanleigh (Discworld)
- Circe (Homer's Odyssey)
- Clarissa (Goosebumps)
- Penelope Clearwater (Harry Potter)
- Adam Conant (The Secret Circle)
- Willie Connolly (Daughter of Darkness)
- Vey Coruscant (Doctrine of Labyrinths)
- Annie Crandall (Circle of Three)
- Cutty-sark (Robert Burns, Tam o' Shanter)

D

- Vanessa Dahl (Engelsfors)
- Aunt Dahlia (Goosebumps)
- Dark Sorceress (Avalon: Web of Magic)
- Kara Davies (Avalon: Web of Magic)
- Alice Deane (The Spook's Apprentice)
- Fleur Delacour (Harry Potter)
- Gabrielle Delacour (Harry Potter)
- Patricia Delfine (All the Birds in the Sky)
- Delphini (Harry Potter and the Cursed Child)
- "Black" Aliss Demurrage (Discworld)
- Kim Diehl (Soul Eater)
- Beryl "Old Mother" Dismass (Discworld)
- Dorrie the Little Witch (Dorrie the Little Witch Series)
- Gemma Doyle (The Gemma Doyle Trilogy)
- Ileana DuBauer (Twitches)
- Miranda Martine-DuBauer (Twitches)
- Lena Duchannes (Caster Chronicles series)
- Ridley Duchannes (Caster Chronicles series)
- Sarafine Duchannes (Caster Chronicles series)
- Ariana Dumbledore (Harry Potter)
- Gillian Duncan (Salem Falls)
- The Dust Witch (Something Wicked This Way Comes)
- Mirri Maz Duur (A Song of Ice and Fire)

E

- Mrs Letice Earwig (Discworld)
- Marietta Edgecombe (Harry Potter)
- Elphaba (Wicked: The Life and Times of the Wicked Witch of the West)
- Empusa (Stardust)
- Erichtho (Lucan's Pharsalia)
- Tabitha Evans (Shadow Falls)

F

- Mrs Fairfax (Howl's Moving Castle)
- Minoo Falk Karimi (Engelsfors)
- Angelica Pierce Fear (Fear Street)
- Fenella Feverfew (The Worst Witch)
- Alexandra Nicole Fielding (Twitches)
- Emily Fletcher (Avalon: Web of Magic)
- Mrs. Flowers (The Vampire Diaries)
- Kimberly Ford (The Fionavar Tapestry)

G

- Magrat Garlick (Discworld)
- Gayelette (The Wonderful Wizard of Oz)
- The Bene Gesserit (Dune)
- Glinda, the Good Witch of the South (The Wonderful Wizard of Oz)
- Melissa Glaser (The Secret Circle)
- Hilta Goatfounder (Discworld)
- Erzulie Gogol (Discworld)
- Good Witch of the North (The Wonderful Wizard of Oz)
- Dame Gothel (Rapunzel)
- The Grand High Witch (The Witches)
- Hermione Granger (Harry Potter)
- Polly Green (Jingle Belle)
- Astoria Greengrass (Harry Potter)
- Grimalkin (Spook's)
- Petulia Gristle (Discworld)
- Tanya Grotter (Tanya Grotter)
- Wilhelima Grubbly-Plank (Harry Potter)

H

- Ethel Hallow (The Worst Witch)
- Mona Hallow (The Worst Witch)
- Sybil Hallow (The Worst Witch)
- Ammeline Hamstring (Discworld)
- Mrs. Happenstance (Discworld)
- Miss Constance Hardbroom (The Worst Witch)
- Sophie Hatter (Howl's Moving Castle)
- Annagramma Hawkin (Discworld)
- Ida Holmström (Engelsfors)
- Desiderata Hollow (Discworld)
- Rolanda Hooch (Harry Potter)
- Mafalda Hopkirk (Harry Potter)
- Henrieta "Hettie" Hubble (The Worst Witch)
- Mildred "Millie" Hubble (The Worst Witch)
- Dimmity Hubbub (Discworld)
- Helga Hufflepuff (Harry Potter)

I

- Yûko Ichihara (xxxHolic)
- Ilse Witch (Ilse Witch)
- Immacolata (character) (Weaveworld)
- Tilly Ipswitch (Tilly Witch)
- Iris (Goosebumps Series 2000)
- Ischade (Thieves' World)
- Ivalaine (The Last Rune)

J

- Jadis of Charn, the White Witch (Narnia)
- Jaelle (The Fionavar Tapestry)
- Angelina Johnson (Harry Potter)
- Hestia Jones (Harry Potter)
- Bertha Jorkins (Harry Potter)
- Juniper (Juniper, Wise Child and Colman by Monica Furlong)

K

- Miranda Kane (Shadow Falls)
- Kyrene (The Last Rune)

L

- Lamia (Stardust)
- Briony Larkin (Chime)
- Lilli (Lilli the Witch)
- Little Witch (The Little Witch)
- Lady of the Green Kirtle (Narnia)
- Leanne (Harry Potter)
- Bellatrix Lestrange (Harry Potter)
- Miss Level (Discworld)
- Alice Longbottom (Harry Potter)
- Augusta Longbottom (Harry Potter)
- Luna Lovegood (Harry Potter)
- Brenda Loveknot (Discworld)
- Lythande (Thieves' World, Lythande)

M

- Aunt Mab (Graveyard School)
- Ciaran MacEwan (Sweep)
- Maghatch (Thunder Oak)
- Maharet and Mekare (The Vampire Chronicles)
- Makenna (The Goblin Wood)
- Maleen, Goth and The Leewit (The Witches of Karres) by James H Schmitz
- Narcissa Malfoy (Harry Potter)
- Mallenroh (The Elfstones of Shannara)
- Madam Malkin (Harry Potter)
- Mother Malkin (Spook's)
- Griselda Marchbanks (Harry Potter)
- Margarita (The Master and Margarita)
- Clio Martin (Balefire)
- Petra Martin (Balefire)
- Keziah Mason (The Dreams in the Witch-House)
- Nurse Matilda (Nurse Matilda)
- Olympe Maxime (Harry Potter)
- The Mayfair Witches (The Witching Hour, Lasher, and Taltos)
- Bonnie McCullough (The Vampire Diaries)
- Diana Meade (The Secret Circle)
- Meg (Meg and Mog)
- Melisandre, The Red Woman (A Song of Ice and Fire)
- Melissa (Matter of France)
- Triss Merigold (The Witcher)
- Minerva McGonagall (Harry Potter)
- Mimi the Witch (Ninja High School)
- Miranda (Shadow Falls)
- Mombi, (The Marvelous Land of Oz, The Lost King of Oz, Lucky Bucky in Oz)
- Maud Moonshine (The Worst Witch)
- Rebecka Mohlin (Engelsfors)
- Morag (The Elfstones of Shannara)
- Kate Morgan (Circle of Three)
- Rachel Morgan (Hollows (series))
- Morgan La Fey ("Excalibur")
- Mormo (Stardust)
- Madame Morrible (Wicked: The Life and Times of the Wicked Witch of the West)
- Morwen (Enchanted Forest Chronicles)
- Moss (Tehanu)

N

- Natasha (The Master and Margarita)
- Nessarose, the Wicked Witch of the East (Wicked: The Life and Times of the Wicked Witch of the West)
- Nettle (Discworld)
- Anna-Karin Nieminen (Engelsfors)
- Enid Nightshade (The Worst Witch)
- Agnes Nitt (Discworld)
- Strega Nona (Strega Nona)
- Agnes Nutter (Good Omens), likely inspired by Alice Nutter

O

- Gytha "Nanny" Ogg (Discworld)
- Tiola Oldstagh (the Sea Witch series) by Helen Hollick
- Madame Olympia (Which Witch?)
- Mardi Overbrook (Summer on East End Series)
- Molly Overbrook (Summer on East End Series)
- Troy Overbrook (Summer on East End Series)
- Orddu (The Black Cauldron)
- Orgoch (The Black Cauldron)
- Orwen (The Black Cauldron)
- The Other Mother (Coraline)

P

- Mistress Letty Parkin (Discworld)
- Pansy Parkinson (Harry Potter)
- Padma Patil (Harry Potter)
- Parvati Patil (Harry Potter)
- Pekka (Darkness)
- Serafina Pekkala (His Dark Materials)
- Persephone (The Raven Cycle)
- Amber Petty (Discworld)
- Irma Pince (Harry Potter)
- Polgara the Sorceress (Belgariad and Mallorean)
- Poppy Pomfrey (Harry Potter)
- Lily Potter (Harry Potter)
- Lily Luna Potter (Harry Potter)
- Mrs. Proust (Discworld)

Q

- Queen (Snow White)
- Laurel Quincey (The Secret Circle)

R

- Helena Ravenclaw (Harry Potter)
- Rowena Ravenclaw (Harry Potter)
- Emma Fier Reade (Fear Street)
- Rhea of the Coos (The Dark Tower series)
- Mother Rigby (Feathertop, short story by Nathaniel Hawthorne)
- Cooper Rivers (Circle of Three)
- Demelza Robins (Harry Potter)
- Madam Rosmerta (Harry Potter)
- Sukie Rougemont (The Witches of Eastwick) by John Updike
- Morgan Rowlands (Sweep) by Cate Tiernan
- Roxane (Thieves' World)

S

- Sarabeth (Goosebumps)
- Sea Witch (The Little Mermaid)
- Madame Semele (Stardust)
- Shiara (Enchanted Forest Chronicles)
- Mistress Shimmy (Discworld)
- Singra (The Wicked Witch of Oz)
- Ruta Skadi (His Dark Materials)
- Rita Skeeter (Harry Potter)
- Jane Smart (The Witches of Eastwick) by John Updike
- Hepzibah Smith (Harry Potter)
- Caryn Smoke (Shattered Mirror)
- Snow Queen (The Snow Queen)
- Snow Witch (Fighting Fantasy)
- Alisa Soto (Sweep)
- Spider Witch (Avalon: Web of Magic)
- Alicia Spinnet (Harry Potter)
- Alexandra Spofford (The Witches of Eastwick) by John Updike
- Pomona Sprout (Harry Potter)
- Susan Sto Helit (Discworld)
- Geoffrey Swivel (Discworld)
- Deirdre Swoop (The Worst Witch)
- Sycorax (The Tempest)
- Sally Rumeno (‘’Sally the Witch’’)

T

- The T*Witches: Camryn Barnes and Alexandra Fielding
- Tarot (Tarot, Witch of the Black Rose)
- Miss Tick (Discworld)
- Diamanda Tockley (Discworld)
- Rose Threep (Whispering to Witches)
- The Three Witches (Macbeth)
- Ruby Tōjō (Rosario + Vampire)
- Andromeda Tonks (Harry Potter)
- Nymphadora Tonks (Harry Potter)
- Eumendines Treason (Discworld)
- Sybill Trelawney (Harry Potter)

U

- Dolores Umbridge (Harry Potter)

V

- Emmeline Vance (Harry Potter)
- Romilda Vane (Harry Potter)
- Vanessa (Goosebumps)
- Septima Vector (Harry Potter)
- Sarah Tigress Vida (Shattered Mirror)
- Dominique Vida (Shattered Mirror)
- Adrianna Vida (Shattered Mirror)

W

- Linnéa Wallin (Engelsfors)
- Lucy Warbeck (Discworld)
- Myrtle Warren (Harry Potter)
- Ginevra Weasley (Harry Potter)
- Molly Weasley (Harry Potter)
- Rose Granger-Weasley (Harry Potter)
- Victoire Weasley (Harry Potter)
- Alison "Nana" Weatherwax (Discworld)
- Esmeralda "Granny" Weatherwax (Discworld)
- Lily Weatherwax (Discworld)
- Kara Westfall (The Thickety)
- Wicked Witch of the East (The Wonderful Wizard of Oz)
- Wicked Witch of the West (The Wonderful Wizard of Oz)
- Winnie (Winnie the Witch)
- Paige Winterbourne (Dime Store Magic)
- The Witch (never named) in Simon and the Witch
- Lolly Willowes, title character of book by Sylvia Townsend Warner
- Winsome Witch (Secret Squirrel)
- Witch of the Waste (Howl's Moving Castle)
- Goodie Whemper (Discworld)
- Suzan Whittier (The Secret Circle)
- Mabel Wrack (Which Witch?)

X

- Xayide (Neverending Story)

Y

- Yukari Sendo (Rosario + Vampire)
- Ysanne (The Fionavar Tapestry)
- Yennefer of Vengerberg(The Witcher)

Z

- Florence Zimmerman (The House with a Clock in Its Walls)
- Queen Zixi of Ix (Queen Zixi of Ix)

== Film and television ==
A

- Hannah Abbott (Harry Potter)
- Agnes (The Vampire Diaries and The Originals)
- Aja (The Vampire Diaries)
- Homura Akemi/Homulilly (Puella Magi Madoka Magica)
- Alexis (The Vampire Diaries)
- Alice (Merlin)
- Emma Alonso (Every Witch Way)
- Amara (Once Upon a Time in Wonderland)
- Angelique (Dark Shadows)
- Anastasia (Once Upon a Time)
- Anastasia (Once Upon a Time in Wonderland)
- Marina Andrieski (The Magicians)
- Ange-Beatrice (Umineko no Naku Koro ni)
- Anguanes (Monster Allergy)
- Jasminka Antonenko (Little Witch Academia)
- Lily Archer (Every Witch Way)
- Ariel (Fantasy Island)
- Jake Armstrong (The Secret Circle)
- Nick Armstrong (The Secret Circle)
- Richard Armstrong (The Secret Circle)
- Royce Armstrong (The Secret Circle)
- Sara Armstrong (The Secret Circle)
- Arusu (Tweeny Witches)
- Mirai Asahina (Maho Girls PreCure!)
- Atelia (Tweeny Witches)
- Featherine Augustus Aurora (Umineko no Naku Koro ni Chiru)
- Azkadellia (Tin Man)
- Ayana (The Vampire Diaries)
- Agatha (Chilling Adventures of Sabrina)

B

- Sarah Baily (The Craft)
- Lady Bane (Disney's Adventures of the Gummi Bears)
- Camryn Elizabeth Barnes (Twitches)
- Bathsheba (The Conjuring)
- Bathilda Bagshot (Harry Potter)
- Barunn (Tweeny Witches)
- Battler (Umineko no Naku Koro ni Chiru)
- Queen Bavmorda (Willow)
- Beatrice (Umineko no Naku Koro ni)
- Freya Beauchamp (Witches of East End)
- Ingrid Beauchamp (Witches of East End)
- Joanna Beauchamp (Witches of East End)
- Wendy Beauchamp (Witches of East End)
- Katie Bell (Harry Potter)
- Belor (Into the Labyrinth)
- Bonnie Bennett (The Vampire Diaries)
- Emily Bennett (The Vampire Diaries)
- Grace Bennett (Passions)
- Kay Bennett (Passions)
- Lucy Bennett (The Vampire Diaries)
- Sheila Bennett (The Vampire Diaries)
- Zoe Benson (American Horror Story: Coven)
- Bernkastel (Umineko no Naku Koro ni)
- Queen Beryl (Sailor Moon)
- Great Aunt Beulah (Sabrina, the Teenage Witch)
- Belladonna Bindweed (The New Worst Witch)
- Big Witch (The Nightmare Before Christmas)
- Isabel Bigelow (Bewitched (film))
- Biris (Tweeny Witches)
- Black Witch/Black Queen (Fantaghirò)
- John Blackwell (The Secret Circle)
- Griselda Blackwood (The Worst Witch)
- Amelia Blake (The Secret Circle)
- Cassie Blake (The Secret Circle)
- Jane Blake (The Secret Circle)
- Madame Blanc (Suspiria)
- Blind Witch (Once Upon a Time)
- Mother Bloodtide (Doctor Who: The Shakespeare Code)
- Amelia Bones (Harry Potter)
- Susan Bones (Harry Potter)
- Constanze Amalie von Braunschbank Albrechtsberger (Little Witch Academia)
- Hannah Bright (Switch)
- Mistress Hecate Broomhead (The Worst Witch)
- Lavender Brown (Harry Potter)
- Millicent Bulstrode (Harry Potter)
- The Beldam/The Other Mother (Coraline)
- Charity Burbage (Harry Potter)

C

- Agatha Cackle (The Worst Witch)
- Miss Amelia Cackle (The Worst Witch)
- Queen Candy (Sugar Sugar Rune)
- Alecto Carrow (Harry Potter)
- Flora Carrow (Harry Potter)
- Hestia Carrow (Harry Potter)
- Castaspella (She-Ra: Princess of Power)
- Minnie Castavet (Rosemary's Baby)
- Mary Cattermole (Harry Potter)
- Diana Cavendish (Little Witch Academia)
- C.C. (Code Geass)
- Dawn Chamberlain (The Secret Circle)
- Faye Chamberlain (The Secret Circle)
- Chappy (Mahōtsukai Chappy)
- Charal (Ewoks: The Battle for Endor)
- Shiny Chariot (Little Witch Academia)
- Charlotte (Puella Magi Madoka Magica)
- Ruby Cherrytree (The Worst Witch)
- Cho Chang (Harry Potter)
- Circe (Hercules)
- Davina Claire (The Originals)
- Mary-Alice Claire (The Originals)
- Aunt Clara (Bewitched)
- Helen Clarke (Wizards vs Aliens)
- Claudia (A Simple Wish)
- Eda Clawthorne (The Owl House)
- Joan Clayton (Penny Dreadful)
- Penelope Clearwater (Harry Potter)
- Holly Cleary (True Blood)
- Queen Clementianna (Mirror Mirror)
- Mary Collins (Merlin)
- Adam Conant (The Secret Circle)
- Ethan Conant (The Secret Circle)
- Cora (Once Upon a Time)
- Katrina Crane (Sleepy Hollow)
- The Cromwell Witches (Halloweentown)
- Splendora Agatha Cromwell (Halloweentown Series)
- Miss Lavinia Crotchet (The Worst Witch)
- Clarice Crow (The Worst Witch)
- Ursula Crowe (Wizards vs Aliens)
- Cas Crowfeather (Weirdsister College)

D

- Dahlia (The Originals)
- Tia Dalma (Pirates of the Caribbean (film series))
- Darcy (Winx Club)
- Dark Witch (Fantaghirò series)
- Misty Day (American Horror Story: Coven)
- Bianca de Passe (Bell, Book and Candle)
- Magica De Spell (DuckTales)
- Ella Dee (Hex)
- Fleur Delacour (Harry Potter)
- Gabrielle Delacour (Harry Potter)
- Desdemona (Every Witch Way)
- Monique Deveraux (The Originals)
- Sophie Deveraux (The Vampire Diaries and The Originals)
- Cruella Deville (Once Upon a Time)
- Lady Diabolyn (Wildfire)
- Dictchwater Sal (Stardust)
- Disaster Brave (Brave Animated Series)
- Mother Doomfinger (Doctor Who: The Shakespeare Code)
- Great Aunt Dorma (Sabrina, the Teenage Witch)
- Nancy Downs (The Craft)
- Penny Dreadful XIII (Penny Dreadful's Shilling Shockers)
- Dreama (Sabrina the Teenage Witch)
- Drizella (Once Upon a Time)
- Miranda DuBauer (Twitches)
- Celeste Dubois (The Vampire Diaries)
- Lena Duchannes (Beautiful Creatures)
- Ridley Duchannes (Beautiful Creatures)
- Sarafine Duchannes (Beautiful Creatures)
- Dust Witch (Something Wicked This Way Comes)
- Mirri Maz Duur (Game of Thrones)
- Dorcas Chilling Adventures of Sabrina (TV series)

E

- Aunt Enchantra (Bewitched)
- The Enchantress (Beauty and the Beast)
- Endora (Bewitched)
- Elaine (The Love Witch)
- Queen Elspeth (Snow White: The Fairest of Them All)
- Elvira (Elvira, Mistress of the Dark)
- Eris (Slayers)
- Evanora (Oz the Great and Powerful)
- Evil Edna (Willo the Wisp)
- Evil-Lyn (Masters of the Universe)
- Evilene (The Wiz)
- Emily Bennett (The Vampire Diaries)
- Eva (Tweeny Witches)
- Evie (Descendants)
- Elspeth ( Chilling Adventures of Sabrina)

F

- Fenella Ferfew (The Worst Witch)
- Alexandra Nicole Fielding (Twitches)
- Cordelia Foxx (American Horror Story: Coven)
- Joanna Frankel (Eastwick)
- Freya, the Ice Queen (The Huntsman: Winter's War)
- Hazuki Fujiwara (Ojamajo Doremi)
- Erika Furudo (Umineko no Naku Koro ni Chiru)

G

- Gaana the Grand Master of Witches (Tweeny Witches)
- Sylvia Ganush (Drag Me to Hell)
- Katherine Gardener (Eastwick)
- Antonia Gavilán de Logroño (True Blood)
- Genevieve (The Originals)
- Grand High Witch (The Witches, 1990 & 2020 film)
- Gertrud (Puella Magi Madoka Magica))
- Glacia the Ice Witch (Sofia the First in the episode "Winter's Gift")
- Gladys (Weapons)
- Melissa Glaser (The Secret Circle)
- Glinda (The Wizard of Oz)
- Hildy Gloom (The 7D)
- Gloria (The Vampire Diaries)
- Porpentina Goldstein (Fantastic Beasts and Where to Find Them)
- Queenie Goldstein (Fantastic Beasts and Where to Find Them)
- Arachne Gorgon (Soul Eater)
- Medusa Gorgon (Soul Eater)
- Veronica Gorloisen (The Sorcerer's Apprentice)
- Harriet Goodcharm (The Worst Witch)
- Fiona Goode (American Horror Story: Coven)
- Chancellor Goodwin (Return to Halloweentown)
- Sarah Goodwin (The Initiation of Sarah)
- Winnie Goodwin (Free Spirit)
- Gothel (Once Upon a Time)
- Cousin Zsa Zsa Goowhiggie (Sabrina the Teenage Witch)
- The Grand Witch (Scooby-Doo! and the Goblin King)
- Grandmama (The Addams Family)
- Great Granny (Sabrina, the Teenage Witch)
- Hermione Granger (Harry Potter)
- Astoria Greengrass (Harry Potter)
- Queen Grimhilde (Snow White and the Seven Dwarfs)
- Grotbags (Emu's World)
- Wilhelmina Grubbly-Plank (Harry Potter)
- Gwen (Sabrina Goes to Rome and Sabrina, Down Under)

H

- Aunt Hagatha (Bewitched)
- Haggar (Voltron: Defender of the Universe, Voltron: The Third Dimension, Voltron: Legendary Defender)
- Haggis (Pumpkinhead)
- Anne Hale (Salem)
- Chris Halliwell (Charmed)
- Melinda Halliwell (Charmed)
- Patricia Halliwell (Charmed)
- Penny Halliwell (Charmed)
- Phoebe Halliwell (Charmed)
- Piper Halliwell (Charmed)
- Prue Halliwell (Charmed)
- Wyatt Matthew Halliwell (Charmed)
- Ethel Hallow (The Worst Witch))
- Mona Hallow (The New Worst Witch)
- Sybil Hallow (The Worst Witch)
- Margo Hanson (The Magicians)
- Miss Constance Hardbroom (The Worst Witch)
- Agatha Harkness (WandaVision)
- Pamela Harman (Paradise Falls)
- Doremi Harukaze (Ojamajo Doremi)
- Hazel the McWitch (Rentaghost)
- Witch Hazel (Disney)
- Witch Hazel (Looney Tunes)
- Hecuba (Passions)
- Hexuba (Power Rangers: Lost Galaxy)
- Hillary Hexton (Sabrina, Down Under)
- Madelyne Hibbins (Smallville)
- Touko Hio (Witchcraft Works)
- Claudia Hoffman (Snow White: A Tale of Terror)
- Gillian Holroyd (Bell, Book and Candle)
- Queenie Holroyd (Bell, Book and Candle)
- Rolanda Hooch (Harry Potter)
- Mafalda Hopkirk (Harry Potter)
- Cynthia Horrocks (The New Worst Witch)
- Henrietta "Hettie" Hubble (The New Worst Witch)
- Mildred Hubble (The Worst Witch)
- Cassie Hughes (Hex)
- Bonnie Hyper (The Craft)

IJK

- Icy (Winx Club)
- Indigo (Sofia the First)
- Ingrid (Once Upon a Time)
- Inukai (Flying Witch)
- Lina Inverse (Slayers)
- Great Aunt Irma (Sabrina, the Teenage Witch)
- Miss Susan Irvine (The Witches)
- Vanessa Ives (Penny Dreadful)
- Riko Izayoi (Maho Girls PreCure!)
- Izetta (Izetta: The Last Witch)
- Jadis, the White Witch (The Chronicles of Narnia: The Lion, the Witch and the Wardrobe)
- Lotte Jansson (Little Witch Academia)
- Billie Jenkins (Charmed)
- Christy Jenkins (Charmed)
- Jennifer (I Married a Witch)
- Jezebelda (Sabrina, the Teenage Witch)
- Joan (Hereditary)
- Angelina Johnson (Harry Potter)
- Atsuko "Akko" Kagari (Little Witch Academia)
- Ayaka Kagari (Witchcraft Works)
- Kazane Kagari (Witchcraft Works)
- Lady Kale (Princess Gwenevere and the Jewel Riders)
- Madoka Kaname/Kriemhild Gretchen (Puella Magi Madoka Magica)
- Megu Kanzaki (Majokko Megu-chan)
- Katrina (Sabrina, the Teenage Witch)
- Kotetsu Katsura (Witchcraft Works)
- Kaylee (American Horror Story: Coven)
- Rin Kazari (Witchcraft Works)
- Elly Kedward (The Blair Witch Project)
- Kiki (Kiki's Delivery Service)
- Kinvara (Game of Thrones)
- Gail Kipling (Sabrina, the Teenage Witch)
- Akane Kowata (Flying Witch)
- Makoto Kowata (Flying Witch)
- Atori Kuramine (Witchcraft Works)

L

- Mater Lachrymarum (Mother of Tears)
- Lady of the Green Kirtle (The Chronicles of Narnia)
- Lambdadelta (Umineko no Naku Koro ni)
- Lamia and her sisters Empusa and Mormo (Stardust)
- Josephine LaRue (The Originals)
- Josette Laughlin (The Vampire Diaries)
- Sabine Laurent (The Originals)
- Marie Laveau (American Horror Story: Coven)
- Leanne (Harry Potter)
- Juniper Lee (The Life and Times of Juniper Lee)
- Marie LeFleur (Chilling Adventures of Sabrina)
- Anna Leigh Leighton (American Horror Story: Coven)
- Leith/Sylvie (Emerald City)
- Endora Lenox (Passions)
- Leta Lestrange (Fantastic Beasts and Where to Find Them)
- Bellatrix Lestrange (Harry Potter)
- Mercy Lewis (Salem)
- Tabitha Lenox (Passions)
- Librarian Witch (Brave Animated Series)
- Lilith (Doctor Who: The Shakespeare Code)
- Lily (Every Witch Way)
- Lily (Sofia the First)
- Lirio (The Craft)
- Little Witch (The Nightmare Before Christmas)
- Lucinda (Sofia the First)
- Alice Longbottom (Harry Potter)
- Luna Lovegood (Harry Potter)
- Lilith (Chilling Adventures of Sabrina)

M

- Queen Mab (Merlin)
- Tara Maclay (Buffy the Vampire Slayer)
- Amy Madison (Buffy the Vampire Slayer)
- Catherine Madison (Buffy the Vampire Slayer)
- Maggy the Frog (Game of Thrones)
- Astrid Malchance (The Originals)
- Narcissa Malfoy (Harry Potter)
- Mother Malkin (Seventh Son)
- Mallory (American Horror Story: Apocalypse)
- Mamanu (Sofia the First)
- Sucy Manbavaran (Little Witch Academia)
- Countess Palatine Ingrid Von Marburg (Salem)
- Maria (Umineko no Naku Koro ni)
- Helena Markos (Suspiria)
- Marla (Sofia the First)
- Greta Martins (The Vampire Diaries)
- Paige Matthews (Charmed)
- Olympe Maxime (Harry Potter)
- Wanda Maximoff/ Scarlet Witch (Marvel Cinematic Universe)
- Rachel McBain ((Hex))
- Minerva McGonagall (Harry Potter)
- Sally "Thorn" McKnight (Scooby-Doo! and the Witch's Ghost)
- Nanny McPhee (Nanny McPhee)
- Elizabeth Meade (The Secret Circle)
- Diana Meade (The Secret Circle)
- Kate Meade (The Secret Circle)
- Alexandra Medford (The Witches of Eastwick)
- Medusa (Witchcraft Works)
- Cinnamon Meilleure (Sugar Sugar Rune)
- Chocolat Meilleure (Sugar Sugar Rune)
- Melisandre, The Red Priestess (Game of Thrones)
- Mei Menowa (Witchcraft Works)
- Mesmira (Conan the Adventurer)
- Kyōichirō Mikage (Witchcraft Works)
- Mina (Hansel and Gretel: Witch Hunters)
- Esther Mikaelson (The Vampire Diaries) and (The Originals)
- Freya Mikaelson (The Originals (TV series))
- Hope Andrea Mikaelson (The Originals) and (Legacies)
- Louise Miller (Teen Witch)
- Regina Mills (Once Upon A Time)
- Sayaka Miki/Oktavia von Seckendorff (Puella Magi Madoka Magica)
- Madam Mim (The Sword in the Stone)
- Misty the Wonderful Witch (Jake and the Never Land Pirates)
- Mirror Queen (The Brother's Grimm)
- Mombi (The Wonderful Land of Oz) and (Return to Oz)
- Nagisa Momoe/Charlotte/Bebe (Puella Magi Madoka Magica)
- Madison Montgomery (American Horror Story: Coven)
- June Moone/ Enchantress (Suicide Squad)
- Morag the Tulgah Witch (Ewoks)
- Morgana Macawber (Darkwing Duck)
- Morgana (The Little Mermaid II: Return to the Sea)
- Morgana (Princess Gwenevere and the Jewel Riders)
- Morgana (Sofia the First in the episode "Gone with the Wand")
- Queen Morgana (King Arthur and the Knights of Justice)
- Morgause (Merlin)
- Mortianna (Robin Hood: Prince of Thieves)
- Stella Munroe (Switch)
- Muriel (Hansel & Gretel: Witch Hunters)
- Dyllis Mustardseed (The New Worst Witch)

N

- Naga the Serpent (Slayers)
- Nan (American Horror Story: Coven)
- Queen Narissa (Enchanted)
- Bastianna Natale (The Originals)
- Nerabu (Tweeny Witches)
- Stevie Nicks (American Horror Story: Coven)
- Cassie Nightingale (The Good Witch)
- Miss Nightingale (The New Worst Witch)
- Enid Nightshade (The Worst Witch)
- Nimue (Once Upon a Time)
- Nimueh (Merlin)
- Prudence Night Chilling Adventures of Sabrina (TV series)

O

- Obaba (Mahōtsukai Chappy)
- Mama Odie (The Princess and the Frog)
- Amanda O'Neill (Little Witch Academia)
- Orddu (The Black Cauldron)
- Orgoch (The Black Cauldron)
- Kady Orloff-Diaz (The Magicians)
- Orwen (The Black Cauldron)
- The Other Mother or the beldam (Coraline)
- Rinon Otometachibana (Witchcraft Works)
- Gillian Owens (Practical Magic)
- Sally Owens (Practical Magic)
- Bridget "Jet" Owens (Practical Magic)
- Maria Owens (Practical Magic)
- Frances Owens (Practical Magic)
- Antonia Owens (Practical Magic)
- Kylie Owens (Practical Magic)

P

- Drusilla Paddock (The Worst Witch)
- Penelope Park (Legacies)
- Lucas Parker (The Vampire Diaries)
- Malachai Parker (The Vampire Diaries)
- Olivia Parker (The Vampire Diaries)
- Pansy Parkinson (Harry Potter)
- Padma Patil (Harry Potter)
- Parvati Patil (Harry Potter)
- Frau Pech (Grimm)
- Pei-Pei (Freaky Friday (2003 film))
- Mrs Pentstemmon (Howl's Moving Castle)
- Serafina Pekkala (The Golden Compass)
- Cecily Pembroke (American Horror Story: Coven)
- Lady Morgana Pendragon (Merlin)
- Seraphina Picquery (Fantastic Beasts and Where to Find Them)
- Irma Pince (Harry Potter)
- Gwen Piper (Halloweentown Series)
- Marnie Piper (Halloweentown Series)
- Sophie Piper (Halloweentown Series)
- Poppy Pomfrey (Harry Potter)
- Evelyn Poole (Penny Dreadful)
- Hecate Poole (Penny Dreadful)
- Lily Potter (Harry Potter)
- Lily Luna Potter (Harry Potter)
- Eglantine Price (Bedknobs and Broomsticks)

QR

- Qetsiyah (The Vampire Diaries)
- Qoo (Tweeny Witches)
- Queen of the Crown (The Adventures of the Galaxy Rangers)
- Queenie (American Horror Story: Coven)
- Alice Quinn (The Magicians)
- Ivory Quintet (Witchcraft Works)
- Ramona (Every Witch Way)
- Rarity the Unicorn (My Little Pony: The Runaway Rainbow)
- Raven Roth (Teen Titans)
- Helena Ravenclaw (Harry Potter)
- Sarah Ravencroft (Scooby-Doo! and the Witch's Ghost)
- Queen Ravenna (Snow White and the Huntsman)
- Fin Raziel (Willow)
- Madame Razz (She-Ra: Princess of Power)
- Rita Repulsa (Mighty Morphin Power Rangers)
- Revolta (Scooby-Doo and the Ghoul School)
- Sukie Ridgemont (The Witches of Eastwick)
- Majo Rika (Ojamajo Doremi)
- Demelza Robins (Harry Potter)
- Willow Rosenberg (Buffy the Vampire Slayer)
- Madam Rosmerta (Harry Potter)
- Ruby (Supernatural)
- Rowena (Supernatural)
- Rumina (The Adventures of Sinbad)
- Alex Russo (Wizards of Waverly Place)

S

- Sadira (Aladdin)
- Kyoko Sakura/Ophelia (Puella Magi Madoka Magica)
- Elvira Montero Azardon de Salcedo (Ilumina)
- Josie Saltzman (The Vampire Diaries) and (Legacies)
- Lizzie Saltzman (The Vampire Diaries) and (Legacies)
- Mary Sanderson (Hocus Pocus)
- Sarah Sanderson (Hocus Pocus)
- Winifred Sanderson (Hocus Pocus)
- Sarah (Stranger in Our House)
- Scáthach (American Horror Story: Roanoke)
- Adalind Schade (Grimm)
- Catherine Schade (Grimm)
- Chronoire Schwarz VI (Witchcraft Works)
- Scylla (Dragons II: The Metal Ages)
- Sea Hag (Thimble Theatre and Popeye)
- Sea Witch (Jake and the Never Land Pirates)
- Elsa Sebastian (Ilumina)
- Melina Montero Azardon de Sebastian (Ilumina)
- Romana Sebastian (Ilumina)
- Tina Sebastian (Ilumina)
- Selena (Supergirl)
- Elizabeth Selwyn (The City of the Dead)
- Robin Sena (Witch Hunter Robin)
- Aiko Senō (Ojamajo Doremi)
- Serena (Bewitched)
- Madam Serena (Teen Witch)
- Mary Sibley (Salem)
- Eva Sinclair (The Originals)
- Aurora Sinistra (Harry Potter)
- Snazzy Shazam (The 7D)
- Shelia (Tweeny Witches)
- Anzu Shiina and her Mother (Flying Witch)
- Myra Shumway (Rough Magic)
- Shuriki (Elena and the Secret of Avalor)
- Rita Skeeter (Harry Potter)
- Christine Slevil-Lewis-White, (The 10th Kingdom)
- Myrtle Snow (American Horror Story: Coven)
- Sorceress of Castle Grayskull (Masters of the Universe)
- Rosanne Speedwell (The New Worst Witch)
- Hilda Spellman (Sabrina, the Teenage Witch)
- Grandma Lydia Spellman (Sabrina, the Teenage Witch)
- Sabrina Spellman (Sabrina, the Teenage Witch)
- Sophia Spellman (Sabrina, the Teenage Witch)
- Aunt Vesta Spellman (Sabrina, the Teenage Witch)
- Zelda Spellman (Sabrina the Teenage Witch)
- Alicia Spinnet (Harry Potter)
- Jane Spofford (The Witches of Eastwick)
- Pomona Sprout (Harry Potter)
- Charity Standish (Passions)
- Samantha Stephens (Bewitched)
- Tabitha Stephens (Bewitched and Tabitha)
- Haley Stephenson (Angel)
- Dinah Stevens (American Horror Story: Apocalypse)
- Mable, Margo and Mitzy Stillman (Charmed)
- Marnie Stonebrook (True Blood)
- Stormy (Winx Club)
- Coco St. Pierre Vanderbilt (American Horror Story: Apocalypse)
- Cousin Susie (Sabrina, the Teenage Witch)
- Emma Swan (Once Upon a Time)
- Deirdre Swoop (The New Worst Witch)

T

- Kasumi Takamiya (Witchcraft Works)
- Mother Talzin (Star Wars)
- Miss Tanner (Suspiria)
- Ellen Taper-Leigh (Hereditary)
- Aldetha Teach (Blackbeard's Ghost)
- Mater Tenebrarum (Inferno)
- Theodora (Oz the Great and Powerful)
- Jude Thomas (Switch)
- Thomasin (The Witch)
- Countess Isobel Marguerite Thoreau (Smallville)
- Alicia Thunderblast (Weirdsister College)
- Emma Tig (Legacies)
- Principal Torres (Every Witch Way)
- Tojola (Rough Magic)
- Mami Tomoe/Candeloro (Puella Magi Madoka Magica)
- Nymphadora Tonks (Harry Potter)
- Tituba (Salem)
- The Three Mothers (The Three Mothers trilogy)
- Hyacinthe Thistlethorps (Big Wolf on Campus)
- Roxanne Torcoletti (Eastwick)
- Sybil Trelawney (Harry Potter)
- The Tri Chi Sorority alias Christy McGraw, Jenifer Hopper and Kim Wilson (Big Wolf on Campus)

UV

- Dolores Umbridge (Harry Potter)
- Urasue (InuYasha)
- Ursula (The Little Mermaid)
- Kanna Utsugi (Witchcraft Works)
- Valeena (Super Robot Monkey Team Hyperforce Go!)
- Romilda Vane (Harry Potter)
- Emmeline Vance (Harry Potter)
- Maddie Van Pelt (Every Witch Way)
- Ursula Van Pelt (Every Witch Way)
- Lady Van Tassel and her sister the Crone from (Sleepy Hollow)
- Asa Vajda (Black Sunday)
- Septima Vector (Harry Potter)
- Asajj Ventress (Star Wars)
- Violet Devereaux (The Skeleton Key)
- Virgilia (Umineko no Naku Koro ni)
- Liesel von Rhuman ( Death Becomes Her )

W

- Waffle (Sugar Sugar Rune)
- Jadu Wali (The Worst Witch)
- Walpurgis Night (Puella Magi Madoka Magica)
- Rosalind Walker (Chilling Adventures of Sabrina)
- Ruth Walker (Chilling Adventures of Sabrina)
- Ileana Warburton (Twitches)
- Brianna Warren (Charmed)
- Melinda Warren (Charmed)
- Myrtle Warren (Harry Potter)
- Prudence Warren (Charmed)
- The Warren Witches (Charmed)
- Grace Watkins (Switch)
- Shadow Weaver (She-Ra: Princess of Power)
- Ginny Weasley (Harry Potter)
- Molly Weasley (Harry Potter)
- Rose Granger-Weasley (Harry Potter)
- Weekend (Witchcraft Works)
- Jenny Wendle (Weirdsister College)
- Cousin Doris West (Sabrina, the Teenage Witch)
- Willow Rosenberg (Buffy the Vampire Slayer)
- White Witch (Fantaghiro)
- Cousin Amanda Wiccan (Sabrina the Teenage Witch)
- Cousin Ally Wiccan (Sabrina the Teenage Witch)
- Cousin Marigold Wiccan (Sabrina, the Teenage Witch)
- Wicked (Cyberchase)
- The Wicked Witch of the West (The Wizard of Oz)
- Julia Wicker (The Magicians)
- Miss Widget (The New Worst Witch)
- Abigail Williams (The Sorcerer's Apprentice)
- Winifred (a.k.a. Freddie) (Chip 'n Dale Rescue Rangers in the episode "Good Times, Bat Times")
- Winsome Witch (Secret Squirrel)
- Crescentmoon "Cressie" Winterchild (The New Worst Witch)
- Witch of the Waste (Howl's Moving Castle)
- The Witch (Monty Python and the Holy Grail)
- The Witch (Scooby-Doo, in the episode "Which Witch is Which")
- The Witch (Big Fish)
- The Witch (Brave)
- The Witch (Into the Woods)
- Witchiepoo (H.R. Pufnstuf)
- Witchmon (Digimon)
- Brianna Withridge (Smallville)
- Wizadora (Wizardora)
- The Witches of Woodstock (American Dragon: Jake Long in the episode "Game On")
- Wuya (as a human) (Xiaolin Showdown)

XYZ

- Xayide (The NeverEnding Story II: The Next Chapter)
- Yubaba (Spirited Away)
- Sally Yumeno (Sally the Witch)
- Yzma (The Emperor's New Groove)
- Zelda (The Swan Princess: The Mystery of the Enchanted Kingdom)
- Zenioba (Spirited Away)
- Zelena (Once Upon a Time)
- Zeta the Sorceress (Shimmer and Shine)
- Zi Yuan (The Mummy: Tomb of the Dragon Emperor)
- Florence Zimmerman (The House with a Clock in Its Walls & 2018 film)
- Rochelle Zimmerman (The Craft)

== Mythical or legendary ==
- Alcina
- Angrboða
- Aradia
- Baba Yaga
- Befana
- The Bell Witch
- Black Annis
- Cassandra
- Cerridwen
- Circe
- The Witch of Endor
- Erichtho
- Freyja
- Grimhild
- Hag
- Hecate
- Hellawes
- Jezebel
- Kikimora
- Lilith
- Lutzelfrau
- Marzanna
- Medea
- Morgause
- Morgan le Fay
- Sea Witch

== Radio ==
- Bibi Blocksberg (Bibi Blocksberg)
- Old Nancy (The Witch's Tale)

== Video games ==
A

- Actrise (Castlevania series)
- Adel (Final Fantasy VIII)
- Badeea Ali (Harry Potter: Hogwarts Mystery)
- Ashley (WarioWare: Touched!)
- Alicia (Bullet Witch)
- Featherine Augustus Aurora (Umineko no naku koro ni)

B

- Baba Yaga ( Quest for Glory)
- Bayonetta (Bayonetta)
- Beldam (Paper Mario: The Thousand-Year Door)
- Belzed (Kick Master)
- Berthilda (Crystal Castles)
- Yoko Belnades (Castlevania: Aria of Sorrow & Castlevania: Dawn of Sorrow)
- Bianca (Spyro: Year of the Dragon)
- Big Bertha (Frogger: The Great Quest)
- Marianna Blavatsky (Return to Castle Wolfenstein)

C

- Cackletta (Mario & Luigi: Superstar Saga)
- Castamira (Arcana)
- Cia (Hyrule Warriors)
- Cierra (Riviera: The Promised Land)
- Cirae-Argoth (Witchaven II)
- Vita Clotilde (Trails)

D

- Dark Queen (Battletoads)
- Deneb (Ogre Battle: The March of the Black Queen)
- Drawcia (Kirby)

E

- Ellen (The Witch's House)
- Ellen (Touhou Project)
- Enchantia (Curse of Enchantia)
- Eva-Beatrice (Umineko no Naku Koro ni)
- Evil Queen (Firelord)
- Evil Queen Badh (Stormlord)

F

- Flemeth (Dragon Age series)

G

- Christelle Grinberry (No More Heroes)
- Hannah Grinberry (No More Heroes)
- Rebecca "Becky" Grinberry (No More Heroes)
- Gruntilda – (Banjo-Kazooie series)

H

- Hagatha (Hearthstone)
- Rinoa Heartilly (Final Fantasy VIII)
- Hecubah (Nox)
- Himiko Yumeno (Danganronpa V3: Killing Harmony)

I

- Ice Queen (Stonekeep)
- Illwhyrin (Witchaven)
- Irene (The Legend of Zelda: A Link Between Worlds)

J

- Jeanne (Bayonetta)
- Jenka (Cave Story)

K

- Kagura (Tenchu: Wrath of Heaven)
- Marisa Kirisame (Touhou Project)
- Patchouli Knowledge (Touhou Project)
- Konoe A. Mercury/Nine The Phantom (Blazblue)
- Kammy Koopa (Paper Mario)
- Edea Kramer (Final Fantasy VIII)
- Serika Kurusugawa (To Heart)
- Kyōgoku Maria (Sengoku Basara)

L

- Lady Maud (The Legend of Zelda: Tri Force Heroes)
- Julia Laforeze (Castlevania: Curse of Darkness)
- Lana (Hyrule Warriors)
- Lil' Witch (Shrek SuperSlam)
- Lulu (Final Fantasy X)
- Luna (Shrek SuperSlam)

M

- Maple (The Legend of Zelda: Oracle of Seasons and Oracle of Ages/The Legend of Zelda: A Link to the Past)
- Alice Margatroid (Touhou Project)
- Marilyn (Paper Mario: The Thousand-Year Door)
- Mai (Touhou Project)
- Marion (Gunbird and Gunbird 2)
- Marjoly (Rhapsody: A Musical Adventure)
- Medusa (Rings of Medusa)
- Metallia (The Witch and the Hundred Knight)
- Mesaanya (Dragon Knight II)
- Midna (The Legend of Zelda: Twilight Princess)
- Emma Millstein (Trails; first appearance The Legend of Heroes: Trails of Cold Steel)
- Minax (Ultima II and Ultima Online)
- Miriam (Wandersong)
- Misery (Cave Story)
- Mizrabel (Castle of Illusion Starring Mickey Mouse)
- Morgana (Vengeance of Excalibur, Chronicles of the Sword, Legion: The Legend of Excalibur)
- Morrigan (Dragon Age series)

O

- Oichi (Sengoku Basara)

P

- Pagan (War Gods)

R

- Rosa (Bayonetta)

S

- Scylla (Hugo)
- Shadow Queen (Paper Mario: The Thousand-Year Door)
- Selena (Lure of the Temptress)
- Siriadne (Shard of Spring)
- Skar (Dun Darach)
- The Sorceress (Spyro: Year of the Dragon)
- Synn (Dungeons & Dragons: Shadow over Mystara)
- Syrup (Legend of Zelda: Oracle of Ages/Legend of Zelda: Oracle of Seasons)

T

- Tabasa (Tessa outside Japan) (Red Earth and Warzard)
- Twinrova (The Legend of Zelda: Ocarina of Time)
- Drolta Tzuentes (Castlevania: Bloodlines)

U

- Ultimecia (Final Fantasy VIII)

V

- Valsharess (Neverwinter Nights)
- Vivian (Paper Mario: The Thousand-Year Door)
- Helga von Bulow (Return to Castle Wolfenstein)

W

- Gruntilda Winkybunion (Banjo-Kazooie & sequels)
- Witches (infected) (Left 4 dead & Left 4 Dead 2)
- Witch (Minecraft)

X

- Xandrilia (Wings of Death)

Y

- Yuki (Touhou Project)
- Yuria (Demon's Souls)
- Yvaine (Battle Realms)

Z

- Zoldrane (Nicky Boum)

== Webcomic ==
- Gwynn (Sluggy Freelance)
- Jade Harley (Homestuck)
- Feferi Peixes (Homestuck)
- Damara Megido (Homestuck)

== See also ==
- Witchcraft
- List of films about witchcraft
