= Balefire =

Balefire may refer to:

- Balefire (novel series), a series of young adult novels by Cate Tiernan
- Balefire (The Wheel of Time), a destructive magical ability in the Wheel of Time series of fantasy novels
