= Tower of Doom =

Tower of Doom may refer to:

- Dungeons & Dragons: Tower of Doom, a 1994 arcade game, based on the Dungeons & Dragons role-playing game
- Tower of Doom (novel), a novel by Mark Anthony, based on the Dungeons & Dragons role-playing game
- Tower of Doom (record label), an independent record label and recording studio based in Quezon City, Philippines.
