= The Thicket =

The Thicket may refer to

- The Thicket (novel), a 2013 novel by Joe R. Lansdale
- The Thicket (film), a 2024 western film based on the novel
- The Thicket (album), a 1998 album by David Grubbs
- The Thicket, Newfoundland and Labrador, Canadian settlement

== See also ==
- Thicket (disambiguation)
- The Thickety, a children’s fiction book series by J. A. White
