= Immortal Beloved (disambiguation) =

Immortal Beloved is the name given by composer Ludwig van Beethoven to an unknown woman in a famous love letter.

Immortal Beloved may also refer to:

- Immortal Beloved (1994 film), a 1994 film about the life of Beethoven
- Immortal Beloved (1951 film), a 1951 West German drama film
- Immortal Beloved (audio drama), a 2007 audio play in the world of Doctor Who
- Immortal Beloved (fiction), a trilogy by Cate Tiernan
