= Wanderlust (Kirchoff and Winter novel) =

1991 novel by Steve Winter and Mary Kirchoff

- Author: Steve Winter and Mary Kirchoff
- Language: English
- Series: Meetings Sextet
- Genre: Fantasy novel
- Publisher: TSR, Inc.
- Publication date: 1991
- Publication place: United States
- Media type: Print (Paperback)
- Pages: 312 pp
- Preceded by: Kindred Spirits
- Followed by: Dark Heart

Wanderlust is a fantasy novel set in the Dragonlance campaign setting of the Dungeons & Dragons fantasy role-playing game.

The novel was written by Steve Winter and Mary Kirchoff, based on characters and settings from Margaret Weis and Tracy Hickman's Dragonlance Chronicles series. Published in 1991, it is the second volume of a six-part series on how the Companions first met.

== Synopsis ==
Wanderlust is a novel which continues the story of Tanis Half-Elven and Flint Fireforge after they come back to Flint's home in Solace. When the kender Tasslehoff Burrfoot accidentally takes a copper bracelet from Flint, Tanis defends Tasslehoff. When they find out that the bracelet is cursed, Flint and Tanis chase Tasslehoff to get it back and all three of them come under danger from a sinister stranger.

== Plot summary ==
Tanis Half-Elven now permanently resides in Solace years after his first meeting with Flint Fireforge in Qualinost. A newcomer, the kender, Tasslehoff Burrfoot arrives in Solace and befriends both Tanis and Flint (much to the dwarf's chagrin), after accidentally 'borrowing' a magical bracelet that the dwarf had just made. As the kender leaves town, he again somehow acquires the bracelet and offers it to a tinker, Gaesil, to return it to the dwarf. However the tinker is shortly thereafter fleeced by a con-artist named Delbridge, who claims the magical bracelet for himself.

A Dargonesti elf, named Princess Selana, locates Flint, Tanis and Tas (who has returned to Solace) and requests the magical bracelet that she had the dwarf create for her. Flint tells that the bracelet has been lost and the four journey to Tantallon, after hearing a rumour of the prophet Delbridge who can see the future through use of a magical bracelet. They arrive in Tantallon to find that Delbridge is now a zombie and that the local lord's son, Rostrevor Curston, has disappeared.

Lord Curston's wizard friend Balcombe now has the bracelet after executing Delbridge. Balcombe has kidnapped Rostrevor, to sacrifice to the evil God Hiddukel to end their bargain that they had made at the beginning of the novel where Hiddukel agrees to spare Balcombe's life in exchange for pure souls. As the party attempt to reclaim the bracelet, Selana is kidnapped and placed in a cave with Balcome's pet giant, Blu. The sea elf and giant become friends and plan to escape. Tanis, Flint and Tas encounter a group of Phaethons and ally with them to drive out Balcombe from their mountain range. The Phaethons and their friends infiltrate Balcombe's lair, and with the aid of the giant Blu, rescue Rostrevor and Selana, and trap Balcombe in a magical gem. Tas unwittingly uses the magical gem and sacrifices Balcombe's soul to Hiddukel.
