= Witch & Wizard (series) =

2009–2014 novels by Patterson and Charbonnet

- Cover of first novel
- Witch & Wizard; The Gift; The Fire; The Kiss; The Lost
- Author: James Patterson; Witch & Wizard; Gabrielle Charbonnet; The Gift; Ned Rust; The Fire; Jill Dembowski; The Kiss; Jill Dembowski; The Lost; Emily Raymond
- Country: United States
- Language: English
- Publisher: Little Brown and Company
- Published: 2009-2014
- Media type: Print (hardback, paperback), ebook, audiobook
- No. of books: 5

Witch & Wizard is a series of dystopian fantasy novels written by James Patterson and Gabrielle Charbonnet. The first novel in the series, Witch & Wizard, was released in 2009. It was followed by a new book in the series each following year, with the exception of 2012, until the release of the last book in the series, The Lost, in 2014. Two graphic novels set in the series' world were released in 2010 and 2011 through IDW Press.

== Synopsis ==
=== Witch & Wizard ===
The novel follows fifteen-year-old Wisty and her eighteen-year-old brother Whit in a dystopian future where people can be brought up on charges of witchcraft. The teens and their parents are charged with witchcraft despite their claims that magic does not exist. They are taken from their parents when they begin to show magical abilities after receiving a book and drumstick. The children meet The One Who Is The One, the leader of the political party the New Order. The teens are sentenced to be executed once they turn eighteen years of age.

Whit is reunited with his long-lost girlfriend Celia, who reveals that she's a half-light spirit that exists in an alternate dimension called the Shadowland. She teaches the two of them how to travel to and from Shadowland, through which they escape to a haven for persecuted children named Freeland. The siblings choose not to remain in the haven, as they wish to find their parents, and learn of a prophecy where they are Liberators who will bring about an end to the New Order. Wisty and Whit begin to plan to take down the regime and reluctantly accept help from Byron, a former classmate who had heavily taken part in their persecution and had been changed into a weasel by Wisty. The trio eventually return to their hometown, where they discover that the siblings' home has been demolished. There, they discover that their parents can communicate with them through magic. During this process, their seemingly worthless book and drumstick are transformed into a spellbook and a magic wand. Byron is also changed back into a human and charged with looking after the siblings.

=== The Gift ===
When Whit and Wisty Allgood were imprisoned by the wicked forces of the totalitarian regime known as the New Order, they were barely able to escape with their lives. Now part of a hidden community of teens like themselves, Whit and Wisty have established themselves as leaders of the Resistance, willing to sacrifice anything to save kidnapped and imprisoned kids.

At the same time, the villainous leader of the New Order is just a breath away from the ability to control the forces of nature and to manipulate his citizens on the most profound level imaginable: through their minds. He needs only one more thing to triumph in his evil quest, the Gifts of Whit and Wisty Allgood, and he will stop at nothing to seize them.

=== The Fire ===
The siblings Whit and Wisty Allgood have every reason to want to take down Nick, especially as he has taken everything and everyone from them. The One has continued his oppressive regime, going so far as to enforce strict censorship where any form of creative output, such as music or even one's imagination, is banned. A showdown is imminent between the three, which will decide the fates of their world.

=== The Kiss ===
With The One Who Is The One defeated, the siblings find that they face new challenges. Wisty is falling for a mysterious and possibly untrustworthy stranger named Heath, and a new power now poses a threat to their world: a Wizard King that has come from the mountains to wage war.

=== The Lost ===
After defeating not only The One Who Is The One but also his father and son, Whit and Wisty have finally started to relax and take on new roles. Their peace is soon shattered, however, when it becomes evident that a new magical threat is endangering their city, resulting in the city turning against magic and the siblings seriously doubting themselves and each other.

== Characters ==
- Wisteria "Wisty" Allgood is a rebellious fifteen-year-old who is shocked to discover her magical ability. Her main powers are the ability to burst into flames at random moments and glow. After learning to control her powers further, she can also turn herself into a mouse and freeze people and animals around her by accident. She also has the ability to cast spells through rhymes her parents taught her when she was young. She is the sister of Whit Allgood.
- Whitford "Whit" Allgood is an eighteen-year-old 'All-American' athlete, who secretly struggles with depression after the unexplained disappearance of the girl he was in love with named Celia. Whit is a wizard, with the power to conjure food, objects, and most animals. He can also move objects with his mind, and is also a powerful healer.
- Celia is Whit's girlfriend who disappeared mysteriously months before the beginning of the book. She was killed by the government but still exists as a Half-light.
- Byron Swain is a classmate of the Allgoods, who betrays them to the government. Wisty accidentally temporarily turns him into a weasel (prompting her to call him the "Tattling Weasel" for the rest of the book). He realizes that he is also madly in love with Wisty and would do anything for her.
- Janine is a teenage girl who is usually the leader of the resistance group and is described as a 'cute girl' by Whit. She is best friends with Margo and is devastated when she is killed.
- Sasha first appears when he rescues the Allgood siblings in the Shadowland. He later lies to them in order to enlist their help in a jailbreak. Sasha is lanky with overgrown black hair.
- The One is the face of the government. Despite being a figure of great power and authority, he conducts himself politely and with quiet dignity. It is strongly implied that he is an evil wizard, possibly on a mission to eradicate all his enemies (meaning the Allgoods). He is after Wisty's Gift, which is controlling fire and electricity. He can also control water, earth, and wind.
- Lost Ones are warmth-consuming zombies who were once humans who got lost in Shadowland.
- Feffer is the loyal 'Hellhound' who accompanied Whit and Wisty through their first journey through Shadowland.
- Ben and Eliza Allgood are Whit and Wisty's parents. Ben is a wizard like Whit, while Eliza is a witch like Wisty.
- Margo is a commando and team leader for the break-in at the Overworld Prison.
- Johnathan is a person in the team who betrays them later on.

== Bibliography ==
=== Novels ===
1. Witch & Wizard (December 14, 2009, Little Brown and Company)
2. The Gift (November 4, 2010, Little Brown and Company)
3. The Fire (December 5, 2011, Little Brown and Company)
4. The Kiss (February 4, 2013, Little Brown and Company)
5. The Lost (December 15, 2014, Arrow)

=== Graphic novels ===
1. Battle for Shadowland (August 26, 2010, IDW Publishing)
2. Operation Zero (April 12, 2011, IDW Publishing)

== Reception ==
Critical reception for the books was mixed to positive and the first novel in the series received reviews from Publishers Weekly, the Horn Book Guide, and the School Library Journal. A reviewer for Booklist praised the prologue as "enticing" while criticizing the first entry by stating that the "meandering plot seems to make up the rules as it goes along". The Guardian reviewed the second novel, The Gift, marking it as a recommended read.
