= Mark Anthony (writer) =

American author

Mark Anthony is an American author who lives and writes in Colorado.

== Career ==
Anthony has written novels set in Dungeons & Dragons campaign settings, including Forgotten Realms, Dragonlance, and Ravenloft. His first such novel was a Crypt of the Shadowking, part of The Harpers series. He has also written several short stories.

Anthony was commissioned by TSR to write a novel about Drizzt Do'Urden titled The Shores of Dusk. By the time the book was completed, Wizards of the Coast had acquired TSR and chose not to publish the novel, instead bringing back R. A. Salvatore to continue writing the Drizzt series, beginning with The Silent Blade (1998).

Anthony is known for The Last Rune series, which explores the relationship between reason and imagination. He has also written a trilogy under the pseudonym Galen Beckett, beginning with The Magicians and Mrs. Quent. The work has been described as drawing on themes similar to those found in the novels of Jane Austen and Charlotte Brontë.

== Partial bibliography ==
=== The Last Rune series ===
- Beyond the Pale (1998)
- The Keep of Fire (1999)
- The Dark Remains (2001)
- Blood of Mystery (2002)
- The Gates of Winter (2003)
- The First Stone (2004)

=== The Magicians and Mrs. Quent series ===
- The Magicians And Mrs. Quent (2008) (as Galen Beckett)
- The House on Durrow Street (2010) (as Galen Beckett)
- The Master of Heathcrest Hall (2012) (as Galen Beckett)

=== Forgotten Realms novels ===
- Crypt of the Shadowking (1993)
- Curse of the Shadowmage (1995)
- Escape from Undermountain (1996)

=== Dragonlance novels ===
- Kindred Spirits (with Ellen Porath) (1991)

=== Ravenloft novels ===
- Tower of Doom (1994)
