= Crypt of the Shadowking =

1993 novel by Mark Anthony

- Cover of the first edition
- Author: Mark Anthony
- Language: English
- Genre: Fantasy novel
- Published: 1993
- Publication place: United States
- Media type: Print (Paperback)
- ISBN: 978-1-56076-594-3
- Preceded by: The Ring of Winter
- Followed by: Soldiers of Ice

Crypt of the Shadowking is a fantasy novel by Mark Anthony, set in the world of the Forgotten Realms, and based on the Dungeons & Dragons role-playing game. It is the sixth novel in "The Harpers" series. It was published in paperback in March 1993.

== Plot summary ==
Harper agents try to stop the Zhentarim as they attempt to take over a city.

== Reception ==
Hugh M. Flick, Jr. of Kliatt magazine said Crypt of the Shadowking was "well written."
