= C.C. Hunter =

American singer and producer

Christie Craig
- Occupation: Writer
- Years active: 1994–present
- Website: www.cchunterbooks.com

C. C. Hunter is the American author of the Shadow Falls young adult novels. She also writes fantasy novels about different creatures. C.C. Hunter is a pen name. Under her real name, Christie Craig, she writes romantic suspense novels.

== Bibliography ==
=== As C.C. Hunter ===
==== The Shadow Falls Series ====
1. Born at Midnight, St. Martin's Press, 2011
2. Awake at Dawn, St. Martin's Press, 2011
3. Taken at Dusk, St. Martin's Press, 2012
4. Whispers at Moonrise, St. Martin's Press, 2012
5. Chosen at Nightfall, St. Martin's Press, 2013
6. Midnight Hour, St. Martin's Press, 2016

==== The Shadow Falls: After Dark Series ====
1. Reborn, St. Martin's Press, 2014
2. Eternal, St. Martin's Press, 2014
3. Unspoken, St. Martin's Press, 2015

==== Shadow Falls Novellas ====
- Turned at Dark, St. Martin's Press, 2011 (A Shadow Falls Short Story)
- Saved at Sunrise, St. Martin's Press, 2013 (A Shadow Falls Novella)
- Unbreakable, St. Martin's Press, 2014 (A Shadow Falls Novella)
- Spellbinder, St. Martin's Press, 2015 (A Shadow Falls Novella)
- Almost Midnight, St. Martin's Press, 2016 (Compilation of the first four Shadow Falls novellas; plus an extra called Fierce)
- Fighting Back, St. Martin's Press, 2016 (A separate Shadow Falls Novella)

==== The Mortician’s Daughter Trilogy ====
1. One Foot In The Grave, BookEnds, 2017
2. Two Feet Under, Ever After Romance, 2018
3. Three Heartbeats Away, Independent, 2019

=== Stand-alone ===
- This Heart of Mine, 2018
- In Another Life, 2019

=== As Christie Craig ===
==== Fiction ====
- Divorced, Desperate and Delicious, Love Spell, 2007
- Divorced, Desperate and Dating, Love Spell, 2008
- Weddings Can Be Murder, Love Spell, 2008
- Divorced, Desperate and Deceived, Dorchester, 2009
- Gotcha, Love Spell, 2009
- Shut Up and Kiss Me, Love Spell, 2010
- Don’t Mess with Texas (Only in Texas), Grand Central Publishing, 2011
- Murder, Mayhem and Mama, 2011
- Blame It on Texas, 2012

==== Nonfiction ====
- The Everything Guide to Writing a Romance Novel, Adams Media, 2008
- Wild, Wicked & Wanton: 101 Ways to Love Like You're In a Romance Novel, Adams Media, 2010
