= Thicket (disambiguation) =

A thicket is a dense stand of trees or shrubs. It may also refer to

- Patent thicket

== See also ==
- The Thicket (disambiguation)
