= Shadow Falls: After Dark =

- Reborn; Eternal; Unspoken
- Author: C.C. Hunter
- Country: United States, Canada
- Language: English
- Genre: Fantasy, Urban Fantasy, Young-Adult Literature
- Publisher: St. Martin's Press
- Published: May 20, 2014—October 27, 2015
- Media type: Print (paperback)
- No. of books: 3
- Preceded by: Shadow Falls

Shadow Falls: After Dark is a sequel series following the fantasy-themed novels, Shadow Falls, written by author C.C. Hunter. The series centers around 16-year-old teen Della Tsang, who must face new challenges that come with being vampire while on her quest to find her place in the world. The three novels are entitled, Reborn, Eternal, and Unspoken.

C.C. Hunter confirmed the continuation of the Shadow Falls series from the perspective of vampire Della Tsang.

== Plot ==
=== Reborn ===
Reborn follows the events after Chosen at Nightfall and centers on the character Della Tsang. The novel was originally to be released on April 15, 2014, but was subsequently delayed to May 20, 2014.

Reborn is set in the Shadow Falls universe, a camp for supernatural teenagers learning to control their abilities. The novel follows Della Tsang, a vampire who feels more at home at the camp than with her human family. When a new vampire, Chase, arrive with unclear motives, Della becomes increasingly drawn to him despite her suspicions. At the same time, she faces continued romantic tension with Steve, a shapeshifter. As Della becomes involved in a new investigation that places her friends in danger, she is forced to work with both Chase and Steve, leading her to reassess her relationships and sense of identity.

=== Eternal ===
Eternal follows the events after Reborn. The novel released on October 28, 2014.

In Eternal, Della Tsang continues her life at Shadow Falls, where she has begun to accept her identity as a vampire. As she develops her role as an investigator, she becomes involved in a case that challenges her sense of responsibility and independence. With the support of her friends Kylie and Miranda, confronts new threats connected to her past. At the same time, her relationships with Chase, a vampire, and Steve, a shapeshifter, continue to create personal conflict, prompting her to further evaluate her priorities and identity .

=== Unspoken ===
The ultimatum in Unspoken takes place after Della's father is arrested for murder. This finale was originally expected to be released in July 2015, but it was later moved to October 27, 2015.

Despite her superhuman strength and enhanced senses, Della Tsang continues to struggle with the challenges of her life as a vampire, especially following her rebirth and her connection to Chase Tallman.

Determined to become an elite paranormal investigator, she takes on a new case involving a twenty-year-old murder tied to her father's past. As she investigates, she uncovers information about the vampire council and about chase, leading to growing distrust.

Although she attempts to distance herself from him, she ultimately requires his assistance as the case brings them into contact with dangerous vampire groups and forces her to confront personal and emotional conflicts.

== Character List ==
=== Protagonists ===
- Della Tsang is the protagonist of Shadow Falls: After Dark. A spunky and sassy vampire, her quick wit and verbal comebacks will make you smile. She regularly comes across too blunt with others while always trying to hide her own pain. Her brusqueness is often a product of her honesty, even when a little less truth might have sufficed. Loyal to those she cares about, she'll be there for you in the blink of an eye. She is also the main character of the spin-off stories - Turned at Dark and Saved at Sunrise.
- Steve is a powerful shape-shifter who is quiet, dependable, and determined when he sets his mind on something. He unintentionally downplays his power as a supernatural because his parents raised him to live in the human world. A rule follower by nature, he's learning that sometimes to get what you want, you have to color outside the lines.
- Chase Tallman is a mysterious and amazingly powerful vampire with more secrets than a rogue were has fleas, who shows up at Shadow Falls and wins Burnett's respect and Della's suspicions.

=== Ghosts ===
- Chan Hon is Della's cousin on her father's side. He died from the rebirthing virus before the start of the series, and his ghost followed Della to make sure she wouldn't lose her life the way he did.
- Lorraine Baker is the ghost in Reborn. She and her boyfriend are murdered by her ex-boyfriend, Phillip Lance. Her death was confirmed to be the work of a vampire, and while initially blaming on a newly-turned teen, Della discovers the true culprit.
- Bao Yu Tsang is Della's late aunt and the ghost in Eternal and Unspoken. She got pregnant at a young age, and had to give away her child to preserve her family's reputation. Sometime later, she was killed by Douglas Stone. Her spirit became confused with the memory and blamed Della's father for her murder, because he was pulling out the knife plunged into her chest when she died.
- Mrs. Chi is an acquaintance of Della's family. She was murdered by a gang of hybrids orchestrated by vampire-warlock hybrid, Douglas Stone (real name Connor Powell).

=== Support characters ===
- Kylie Galen is the protagonist of the first Shadow Falls series. A chameleon, a ghost whisperer, and a protector. One of Della's best friends and confidants, whose compassion and gentle approach to life Della wishes she could emulate.
- Miranda Kane is a dyslexic witch whose powers have yet to be completely mastered. Fun and flirty, the girl has a flair for drama, but a heart of gold. She is one of Della's best friends. Though they constantly bicker, they are actually very close as friends.
- Holiday Brandon is the camp leader of Shadow Falls. caring, nurturing fae, who is an empath with an amazing gift to communicate with the living and the dead. She is married to Burnett James, the vampire camp leader.
- Burnett James is an agent of the FRU and the newest camp leader after Holiday's previous partner, Sky Peacemaker, was removed from her position for betrayal. A badass vampire who's overprotective, sucks at communicating—but is working on it—and cares deeply. Oh, and hardheaded.
- Jenny Yates is a powerful chameleon who's lived most of her life on a Chameleon compound trying to hide her very existence. Like most chameleons, she dreads being in the limelight, and yet she's hungry to experience the life that she has been cheated of.
- Lucas Parker is Kylie's werewolf boyfriend. A stubborn yet extremely loyal werewolf, now a member of the Were council. He fought tradition and has chosen his soul mate, a chameleon, in spite of his pack's belief that he must marry another were to keep their blood line pure.
- Derek Lakes is kindhearted, sweet, and smart... the kind of guy girls like, but seem to leave. He's half fae, half human, and his special gifts include being an empath to animals as well as humans and supernaturals.
- Perry Gomez is Miranda's boyfriend. A sweet yet powerful shape-shifter abandoned by his parents at an early age. As a child, he had a hard time co-existing in the human world due to his inability to control his shifts. Witty and the class clown, he learned to hide his emotions with a joke.
- Hannah Rose James is the newborn daughter of Burnett James and Holiday Brandon. She is half-vampire and half-fae.
- Chao Tsang is Della's estranged father. He distanced himself from Della after she became a vampire.
- Sharron Tsang is Della's American mother. She was kept in the dark about her daughter's vampirism until the end of Unspoken.
- Marla Tsang is Della's younger sister. She was kept in the dark about her sister's vampirism until the end of Unspoken.
- Natasha Owen is Della's long-lost cousin. She was given away at birth, and became a vampire at adolescence.
- Liam Jones is Natasha's boyfriend. They met under the same underground fighting organization.
- Shawn Hanson is a warlock who worked for the FRU. He has harbored feelings for Miranda for a long time.
- Eddie (real name Feng Tsang) is Della's uncle, the twin brother of Chao. He became a vampire at a young age and faked his death to preserve his secret. He was the one who took in Chase Tallman and helped him through the rebirthing process.
