= Kindred Spirits (novel) =

1991 novel by Mark Anthony

- Cover of the first edition
- Author: Mark Anthony and Ellen Porath
- Language: English
- Series: Meetings Sextet
- Genre: Fantasy novel
- Publisher: TSR, Inc.
- Publication date: 1991
- Publication place: United States
- Media type: Print (Paperback)
- Pages: 337 pp
- Followed by: Wanderlust

Kindred Spirits is a fantasy novel set in the Dragonlance fictional universe. It was written by Mark Anthony and Ellen Porath, based on characters and settings from Margaret Weis and Tracy Hickman's Dragonlance Chronicles series. Published in 1991, it is the first volume of a six-part series on how the Companions first met.

== Synopsis ==
Kindred Spirits is a novel in which Flint Fireforge has been invited to the kingdom of the Qualinesti elves for his legendary skills in metalsmithing, where he befriends the outcast Tanis Half-Elven who is framed for murder by a jealous rival.

== Plot summary ==
The book narrates the first meeting between dwarven metalsmith, Flint Fireforge and a young Tanis Half-Elven. While working and living in his hometown of Solace creating jewelry, Flint receives a wondrous summons from the Speaker of the Sun, Solostran who admires Flint's work. Flint journeys to the fabled elven city of Qualinost, where he spends every Spring working on jewelry and projects for the Speaker of the Sun. Foreigners are not allowed in Qualenesti, therefore Flint finds himself an outcast. There he meets Tanis, a thoughtful youth born of a tragic union between elf and man. Flint and Tanis, each being a misfit in their own ways, Flint for being a dwarf and Tanis for being of mixed race, find themselves unlikely friends.
