= Curse of the Shadowmage =

1995 fantasy novel by Mark Anthony

- Cover
- Author: Mark Anthony
- Language: English
- Series: "The Harpers"
- Genre: Fantasy novel
- Published: 1995
- Publication place: United States
- Media type: Print
- ISBN: 978-0-7869-0191-3

Curse of the Shadowmage is a fantasy novel by Mark Anthony, set in the world of the Forgotten Realms, and based on the Dungeons & Dragons role-playing game. It is the 11th novel published in the series "The Harpers". It was published in paperback, November 1995.

== Plot summary ==
Curse of the Shadowmage is a novel about the Harpers, who strive for freedom and justice.

== Reception ==
Jonathan Palmer reviewed Curse of the Shadowmage for Arcane magazine, rating it a 5 out of 10 overall. He stated, "Very pleasing, this Forgotten Realms adventure, if only because it considers the spiritual nature of magic rather than just using magic as a plot device to get the heroes out of sticky situations. Referees will find new ways of looking at old magic." He added that the novel has "got some good ideas, but as a novel it's less than great; the characterization is not sufficiently sympathetic for the reader to care about the outcome." He states that "The writing is articulate, but not always satisfying; for example, when a milk-cow gets turned inside out at a Harvest Festival, the author alludes to all kinds of other shadow-wrought grotesquerie without actually describing it in detail. Why not?" Palmer concluded his review by stating: "As well as these failings, the writer's descriptive skills managed to lose me once or twice in this slow-paced book. It's a reasonably good read, but I wouldn't go out of my way to lend it to you."
