= Shadow Falls =

Novel by C.C. Hunter

- Born at Midnight; Awake at Dawn; Taken at Dusk; Whispers at Moonrise; Chosen at Nightfall
- Author: C.C. Hunter
- Country: United States, Canada
- Language: English
- Genre: Fantasy, Urban Fantasy, Young-Adult Literature
- Publisher: St. Martin's Press
- Published: March 11, 2011 – April 23, 2013
- Media type: Print (paperback); E-book
- No. of books: 5 (novels); 5 (side-stories)
- Followed by: Shadow Falls: After Dark

Shadow Falls is a series of fantasy-themed novels by American author C.C. Hunter. The series centers on 16-year-old teen Kylie Galen, who is sent off to Shadow Falls Camp by her mother and discovers the camp is covertly a summer institution for supernatural beings. The discovery sets her on a quest to discover her own supernatural identity, frequently interrupted by confrontations with spirits.

The first novel, Born at Midnight, was published on March 11, 2011; the second, Awake at Dawn, on October 11, 2011; the third, Taken at Dusk, on April 10, 2012; the fourth book, Whispers at Moonrise, on October 2, 2012. The fifth and final novel, Chosen at Nightfall, was released on April 23, 2013. On March 15, 2011, a related short story, entitled "Turned at Dark", was released. A side-story, "Saved at Sunrise", was released as an e-book on Amazon on April 2, 2013, followed by "Unbreakable" on September 30, 2014, and finally "Spellbinder" on June 30, 2015. The three short stories were eventually released as a novella on February 2, 2016, with the addition of a new story titled "Fierce".

C.C. Hunter subsequently announced that she would continue the series from the perspective of vampire Della Tsang, calling the continuation Shadow Falls: After Dark. A standalone novel, Midnight Hour, was released on October 25, 2016 as the concluding chapter of the franchise.

== Characters ==
=== Protagonists ===
- Kylie Galen is the protagonist of the Shadow Falls series. She has always felt that she didn't belong, but she never imagined how much. When her mother sends her to Shadow Falls Camp, she learns that the place is not filled with troubled teens as she's told, but with supernatural creatures: vampires, werewolves, fairies, shape-shifters, and witches. The problem is, she is one of them, but no one knows what she is, and her quest to find out begins. But problems don't stop coming from there - she is constantly followed by a certain spirit that only she can see, her heart is tormented by her parting family and two guys who have a strong affection on her; the handsome and generous Derek who shares her feelings, and the hotheaded werewolf Lucas, who shares a secret past with her.
  Throughout the series, she develops multiple special powers, such as "dreamscaping", superhuman speed, superhuman strength, and healing that only comes when she wishes to protect others. At the end of Taken at Dusk, she finds out that her species is called "chameleon": a hybrid that acquires abilities from several species passed down through the generations. In Whispers at Moonrise, she begins to show brain patterns and abilities of witches, vampires, fae and werewolves, respectively. At the end of Whispers at Moonrise, she leaves Shadow Falls to live with her grandfather. In Chosen at Nightfall, Kylie returns to Shadow Falls and discovers an enchanted sword to aid her in an upcoming battle against Mario. She searches in her heart and finally realizes her true feelings for Lucas. At the end of the novel, she confesses those feelings and successfully defeats Mario as well as his son John on the mission to save her mother while also ensures the acknowledgement of chameleons to the open world.
- Derek Lakes is one of Kylie's two love interests in the storyline. He is a half-fae with power to sense/control emotions, erase memories, dreamscape and communicate with animals. Because his father left him at an early age, he formed a deep dislike to his hereditary powers. In the beginning of Born at Midnight, he attends Shadow Falls Camp solely to learn how to give up these abilities, but when he uses them to save the camp and Kylie, he finally learns the benefits of having them and openly embraces them. He has a strong connection with Kylie, but her affection towards Lucas and his ability to sense a powered-up version of her emotions put them at a distance. Near the end of Awake at Dawn, he leaves the camp to go on missions for the FRU (Fallen Research Unit), but returns in Taken at Dusk with ex-girlfriend, Ellie Mason, whom he confesses to having slept with when they reunited. At the end of Taken at Dusk, he confesses his love to Kylie and maintains as her friend in Whispers at Moonrise. In Chosen at Nightfall, he tries to get close to Kylie again, but she turns him down, saying they both had moved on. From then on, the two become friends officially. Near the end of the novel, Derek meets and falls for another chameleon named Jenny Yates.
- Lucas Parker is the other of Kylie's love interests. He is a stubborn and possessive werewolf, who shares a secret past with Kylie. They first met when they were children, but Lucas has had a relentless affection towards her since then. They never saw each other again until 11 years later, when they reunite at Shadow Falls Camp. Near the end of Born at Midnight, he leaves the camp to free his half-sister from a werewolf gang.
  In Awake at Dawn, he is occasionally visited by Kylie in his dreams before his return to Shadow Falls, and saves her from a rogue vampire's capture. They begin a relationship sometime after Derek left the camp, but things become complicated when his pack and family refuse to let him be with someone not of their own kind. This very problem causes a rift between the two as Lucas himself wishes for Kylie to be a werewolf. He eventually finds out that she is a chameleon, but continues his relationship with her, saying that he loves her too much to let her go. At the end of Whispers at Moonrise, Kylie finds out that he is engaged to another werewolf in hopes of getting his father's vote to join the Werewolf Council and breaks off their relationship. In Chosen at Nightfall, Lucas gives up everything to win back her trust and affection. He also assigns himself to teach Kylie how to fight with a sword after a magical crusader sword appeared to her, and finds a way to join the Council without having to go through marriage. He manages to save Kylie from John Esparza and help her kill him at the end of the novel. Kylie chooses Lucas instead of Derek by the end of the series.
- Della Rose Tsang is a newly turned vampire with a stoic and headstrong personality and a bad attitude. She is Kylie and Miranda's best friend and roommate. She became a vampire when she encountered her cousin Chan in January, the encounter which activated her vampire genes, and he taught her everything he knew about supernaturals. She is known to have been raised in a strict family, being half Chinese and half American. She had a boyfriend named Lee and dreamed of working in law enforcement rather than her father's plans of being a doctor. After her transformation, her family is led to believe that she is doing drugs and gets sent to Shadow Falls Camp for rehabilitation. In Born at Midnight, she befriends Miranda and Kylie, and helps conduct a plan to investigate the repeating murders of endangered animals in the next-door wildlife park. In Awake at Dawn, when Kylie mentions her knowledge about the death angels, Della begins to worry about what she might've done during her early stage as a vampire. Burnett takes her into the FRU agency for testing, and confirms her innocence. Near the end of Awake at Dawn, she returns home for parents weekend and finds out that Lee has found a new girlfriend. Della is assigned to be one of Kylie's shadows in Taken at Dusk, along with Jonathon, Perry, Derek, Miranda and Lucas. She also helps Kylie encourage Miranda's relationship with Perry, which she later regrets in Whispers at Moonrise since Miranda continuously talks about Perry. Burnett assigns her and Steve on a secret mission to confront a group of murderous vampires. During their time away, Steve comes to her aid again and again; first being when they confronted a drunken man beating up his wife; later when she runs into her ex-boyfriend and his new girlfriend, Steve kisses her in public to save her from embarrassment; during the mission, Della is forced to fight a werewolf-vampire girl to the death and gets stabbed in the chest. Steve fights the vampires and escapes with her, and later saves her from a pack of werewolves. While being treated by Steve, they give in to their passions and make out, but regrets it almost immediately. She then makes it clear to Steve that they will never start a relationship. When she returns with a hickey in Chosen at Nightfall, Miranda and Kylie demand answers. Steve continues to fight for her affection, despite her constant avoidance. He goes as far as to turn to Kylie for advice and paying blood to get Della to spend time with him.
  She is the main character of the spin-off stories - Turned at Dark that journeys her transformation and her decision to attend Shadow Falls, and Saved at Sunrise where Burnett James sends her and shape-shifter Steve on a mission. Furthermore, after Chosen at Nightfall, Della is next protagonist in the Shadow Falls continuation: Shadow Falls: After Dark.
- Miranda Kane is a dyslexic witch, and Kylie's and Della's second best friend and roommate. She befriends Kylie and Della upon her second visit to Shadow Falls Camp. Though she is on good terms with both Kylie and Della, she often quarrels with Della using threatening remarks. In Taken at Dusk, she begins a relationship with shape-shifter Perry Gomez. She is known for messing up her spells due to her dyslexia. In Chosen at Nightfall, Miranda angrily turns Nikki, a shapeshifter, into a kangaroo and then curses her with large zits all over her body out of jealousy of her affection toward Perry. Miranda is the main protagonist alongside Perry and a warlock named Shawn Hanson in Midnight Hour.

=== Antagonists ===
- Mario Esparza is a member of the vampire council and the main antagonist of the entire series. He first appears in Awake at Dawn, where he has his grandson, Roberto, kidnap Kylie to make her his granddaughter-in-law. After this failed, he makes multiple attempts to kill her, including creating sink holes and summoning lightning. His grandson, however, stops him every time, and in the end, dies for his betrayal. Mario is supposedly a vampire, but his powers go far beyond the regular vampire for unknown reasons. At the end of Chosen at Nightfall, Mario confronts Kylie in a sword fight, but is stabbed to death by his own son, and his soul taken to hell.
- Roberto Esparza is the initial antagonist of the Shadow Falls series. He was a key member of the dangerous Blood Brothers Gang - a group of vampires - and aimed to shut down Shadow Falls Camp. During a run-in and struggle with Kylie Galen and Derek Lakes caught Red's affection of Kylie. He captured Kylie in Awake at Dawn in a failed attempt to make her his bride. In Taken at Dusk, he made multiple attempts to protect her from his grandfather's assassinations, ultimately sacrificing himself by taking a bolt of lightning meant for Kylie and dies, in which lands his soul a place in heaven.
- Collin Warren is the main antagonist of Whispers at Moonrise. He is a half-fae serial killer who went after Hannah, Holiday's twin sister, and later attempted to kill Holiday. He infiltrated Shadow Falls as a recommended history teacher. Hannah's soul tried to warn Kylie about Collin, but her lack of memory made her unable to recognize Collin. Kylie and Fredericka found him whilst trying to strangle Holiday and Fredericka killed him at the end of Whispers at Moonrise.
- John Anthony Esparza is Mrs. Galen's newfound love interest in Taken at Dusk. He is very rude and controlling, and Kylie highly dislikes him, especially after he started a fist fight with Tom in Whispers at Moonrise. At the end of Chosen at Nightfall, Kylie discovers that he is actually Mario Esparza's son. In the midst of a struggle between Mario and Kylie, John kills his own father, then tries to kill Kylie. With a combined struggle from Lucas and Kylie, he is given the fatal blow and his soul taken to hell.

=== Ghosts ===
- Daniel Brighten is the ghost of Kylie's biological father. He died when Kylie's mother was pregnant, and his soul has watched over them for 16 years. Because he was adopted by a family of humans, he knew nothing about his magical heritage until in his late teens. He was the first ghost that Kylie met. At the end of Born at Midnight, she finds out that Daniel is her biological father. At the end of Taken at Dusk, he meets his biological mother and finds out that his species is called "chameleons", and then goes forth to inform Kylie of this. Because his time limit on Earth has been used up, his ability to materialize becomes less dormant. At the end of Chosen at Nightfall, Daniel becomes a death angel meant to watch over Kylie.
- Fanny Mildred Bogart is Sara's deceased grandmother. She is the resident ghost who appears to Kylie in the book, Awake at Dawn. She constantly tells her to save someone, but has been unable to specify the person, until Kylie paid a visit to her granddaughter and found out that she was referring to her. Kylie healed Sara with her newfound healing power and Fanny's ghost moved on.
- Heidi Summers is Kylie's deceased paternal grandmother. She died sometime after giving birth to Daniel, killed during an experiment performed by the FRU back in the 1960s due to their curiosity with Heidi's kind: the chameleons. She first appears at the end of Awake at Dawn as an amnesiac ghost, but slowly recovers her lost memories. She eventually realizes that Kylie is her granddaughter and meets her son's spirit after moving on.
- Hannah Brandon is Holiday's identical twin who was murdered by Collin Warren. After her death, her spirit visited Kylie in hopes of preventing her killer from going after her sister. Because she ruined her sister's happiness by sleeping with her fiancé, Hannah's spirit was filled with grief and shame, and so refused to visit Holiday. When Collin trapped Hannah's spirit, Lucinda helps bring Kylie to communicate with her. After Hannah and Holiday resolved their issues and Kylie saved Holiday, Hannah's spirit moved on.
- Lucinda Esparza (née Edwards) is the resident ghost who haunts Kylie in Chosen at Nightfall. She is the deceased mother of Roberto Esparza, the ex-wife of John Anthony Esparza and ex-daughter-in-law of Mario Esparza. She was murdered by assassins hired by Mario when she tried to save her son from being raised by evil. Throughout the novel, she continuously tells Kylie that she needs to kill someone, or she will die. Lucinda personally teaches Kylie sword fighting and later helps her defeat Mario and John. Due to her good deed, her soul is given a chance to redemption and a potential chance to ascend to heaven.

=== Secondary characters ===
- Holiday James (née Brandon) is the camp leader of Shadow Falls Camp. She treats Kylie like a sister and often acts as her guide in her quests to help spirits and self-discovery. She is a fairy with the power to communicate with ghosts and influence emotions. She is frequently attracted to Burnett, but due to a heartbreaking past with another vampire, she often dismisses those feelings. It is revealed in Whispers at Moonrise, that this experience was caused by her identical twin, Hannah, who slept with her boyfriend, who later became her fiancé, before the wedding. She later finds out that her twin is murdered, and the murderer is after her as well. At the end of Whispers at Moonrise, she makes amends with her sister and accepts Burnett's whirlwind proposal. In Chosen at Nightfall, Holiday finds out that she is pregnant, and marries Burnett.
- Burnett James is an agent of the FRU and the newest camp leader after Holiday's previous partner, Sky Peacemaker, was removed from her position for betrayal. He is a hotheaded vampire who is attracted to Holiday, and always does his best to keep the camp and its inhabitants safe, especially Kylie. His loyalty for the FRU agency gradually shifts to Shadow Falls as he spends time caring for the students and staff. In Whispers at Moonrise, he begins to see ghosts and the spirit of Holiday's twin, Hannah. After Holiday's near-death experience, he declares his love for her and asks her to marry him, to which she accepts. In Chosen at Nightfall, Burnett finds out that Holiday is pregnant and, though insecure at first, comes to accept his little family and marries the woman.
- Perry Gomez is known as one of the most powerful shape-shifters in the world; he can transform into any creature he can imagine. He develops a crush on Miranda but doesn't dare to admit anything. At the beginning of Awake at Dawn, she gets kissed by Kevin, a fellow shape-shifter, and Perry flies into fighting rage. He then kisses Miranda and dumps her on the spot and ignores her for most of the book. After some time, he starts a fight with Clark, a warlock, who shoves Miranda; the dining room is almost destroyed by the fight. He finally begins to follow his heart and asks Miranda out. From then on, they become a couple. Throughout Taken at Dusk, Whispers at Moonrise and Chosen at Nightfall, he is assigned by Burnett to be one of Kylie's "shadows" - a bodyguard, until Burnett ends the shadowing duties. At the beginning of Chosen at Nightfall, he flips Kylie's uncomfortable situation by showing everyone his buttocks and sway their attention to him. A brief argument occurs between Miranda and Perry when his girlfriend turns Nikki, a fellow shape-shifter, into a kangaroo out of jealousy, but they make up afterwards.
- Mrs. Galen is Kylie's mother. She was initially depicted as cold-hearted, and Kylie often assumed she didn't love her, until she proved otherwise. At the end of Born at Midnight, Mrs. Galen tells Kylie about her natural father's origin when Kylie discovers the resemblance between her, and a ghost named Daniel. Throughout the series, she is kept in the dark about the world of supernaturals and the fact that her daughter is one of them. On one occasion, she accidentally witnessed Jonathon drinking Helen's blood and Derek was forced to erase her memory. It is noted in Taken at Dusk that she is descended from a Native American tribe with special gifts that pass down through the generations. She meets and falls in love with a man named John Anthony in Taken at Dusk but finds out about his evil side at the end of Chosen at Nightfall when Kylie comes to her rescue. After this, she finally tells her mother about the supernatural world.
- Fredericka Lakota is a werewolf student of the camp. She is part of Lucas's group and is very deeply affectionate toward him, which is why she is incredibly resentful at Kylie for his affection. She often tries to find ways to scare her off and is openly hostile towards her and her friends. In Whispers at Moonrise, she helps Kylie save Holiday from Collin Warren and defeats him in combat. Through this experience, they begin to come to terms with one another. She is the one who tells Kylie about Lucas's engagement party. In Chosen at Nightfall, Fredericka develops new affection toward the new history teacher, Cary Cannon, and turns to Kylie for advice, effectively ending their rivalry and her affection toward Lucas.
- Sara Jetton has been Kylie's best childhood friend since before the beginning of the series. She is described as flirty and often worries about not fitting in. When Kylie was first sent to Shadow Falls Camp, Sara worried that she might be pregnant, but the test result was negative. In Awake at Dawn, she develops cancer and Kylie uses her newfound power to heal her, at the request of Sara's deceased grandmother. In Taken at Dusk, she accompanies Kylie's mother to visit Kylie, but the situation turns awkward when she meets Kylie's new friends, and their friendship never becomes the same again, though they are still friends. They lose contact for some time, but in Chosen at Nightfall, Sara calls Kylie to confess that she has started a relationship with her friend's ex-boyfriend, Trey, and gets a haircut.
- Tom Galen is Kylie's stepfather. He married Kylie's mother as soon as he found out she was pregnant with Daniel's child to save her family from shame. His only condition was to never let Kylie know that she wasn't his child. He was kicked out of the house by his wife at the beginning of the series after she found out that he was cheating on her. Kylie was closest to him before discovering his affair, which drives her further apart from him. In Whispers at Moonrise, he files divorce papers with his wife, but Kylie has come to forgive him for his mistake.
- Malcolm Summers is Kylie's paternal grandfather and a chameleon. He is very distrustful of the FRU due to his heartbreaking history with the agency and tries to persuade Kylie to live with him instead of staying at Shadow Falls, since the school is affiliated with the agency. His prejudice against Shadow Falls finally lets up some in Chosen at Nightfall.
- Francyne is Kylie's great-aunt and a chameleon. She is very distrustful of the FRU due to her people's history with the agency and her sister's death. In Chosen at Nightfall, she comes to lift her prejudice against Shadow Falls.
- Hayden Yates is a chameleon working with Malcolm and a teacher at Shadow Falls. He first appears at the camp pretending to be a half-fae and half-vampire science teacher. Kylie is initially incredibly suspicious of his motives, even though he always speaks the truth. In the end, she finds out about his true agenda (he is working with her grandfather to keep her safe), and leaves Shadow Falls with him. In Chosen at Nightfall, he accompanies Kylie to the FRU's base to get their genetics tested as a way of officially presenting chameleons to the supernatural world.
- Steve is a shape-shifter that Della is interested in and shares a cabin with Lucas. He supposedly has sandy-colored hair and a cute butt, and shows interest in Della, who is constantly avoiding his attention. In Whispers at Moonrise, he is assigned by Burnett to go on a mission with Della, much to her dismay. They bond during their time away from Shadow Falls; Steve comes to her rescue when her ex-boyfriend spots her at a local Chinese restaurant. He comes to her rescue again when they confront the vampire bureau that Burnett sent them to, and again when they run into a pack of werewolves. During the mission, Della gets stabbed, and Steve takes time to care for her. When they return in Chosen at Nightfall, Della avoids him completely. Steve turns to Kylie for advice, and decides to fight for Della's affection, much to her dismay.
- Chan Hon is Della's cousin, who faked his death in France after he became a vampire. When he ran into Della by accident, her vampiric virus activated, which turned her into a vampire. Chan took care of her but was very unsupportive with her decision to join Shadow Falls. He visits Della on her first day at camp. In Reborn, he died due to the rebirthing process.
- Kenneth Brighten is Daniel's adopted father and Kylie's adopted grandfather. He makes his first appearance in Chosen at Nightfall when he and his wife come to Shadow Falls to meet their granddaughter. At the end of the book, they meet Daniel's biological family whilst getting invited to Burnett's and Holiday's wedding.
- Becky Brighten is Daniel's adopted mother and Kylie's adopted grandmother. She makes her first appearance in Chosen at Nightfall when she and her husband come to Shadow Falls to meet their granddaughter. At the end of the book, they meet Daniel's biological family whilst getting invited to Burnett's and Holiday's wedding.

=== Other characters ===
- Helen Jones is a half-fae with the power to heal internal diseases and detect brain tumors. She uses this power to scan Kylie's brain and confirms that she is tumor-free in Born at Midnight. After this, she becomes one of Kylie's closest of friends, and starts a relationship with Jonathon, a newly turned vampire, with advice from Kylie. In Chosen at Nightfall, Helen is attacked outside of campus. Though the identity of her attacker is a mystery, many believe it was Mario Esparza, the evil chameleon who commits evildoings in the vampire community. She returns to school one week later, but hardly encounters Kylie.
- Jonathon is a newly turned vampire. He begins a relationship with Helen in the middle of Born at Midnight. In Taken at Dusk, he assigns himself as Kylie's "shadow" (meaning: bodyguard). Though he rarely hangs out with Kylie's group of friends, he is one of them, including Helen. In Chosen at Nightfall, Jonathon is distraught by Helen's attack and accidentally knocks down Kylie's stepfather when he enters campus ground uninvited.
- Ellie Mason is Derek's ex-girlfriend and a vampire. Derek brought her to Shadow Falls Camp after crossing paths with her in Pennsylvania. Though she likes Kylie, Derek's love interest, Kylie shows opposite affection, especially after finding out that she had slept with Derek. They eventually move past their issues and become friends of sorts. At the end of Taken at Dusk she dies trying to protect Derek from Mario Esparza, and her spirit guides Kylie to his whereabouts before moving on to heaven.
- Kevin is a shape-shifter and Perry Gomez's friend before he kissed Miranda and turned their friendship into rivalry.
- Mandy is a fae who likes to kiss anyone on the lips. In Born at Midnight, Derek used her to make Kylie jealous.
- Trey Cannon is Kylie's ex-boyfriend. He broke up with her shortly before the beginning of the series. He tries to reconcile with Kylie in Born at Midnight, but she brushes him off. Initially, she finds Derek's looks quite similar to Trey, but later comes to like Derek himself. It is later revealed in Awake at Dawn that he hooked up with Sara after Kylie's rejection.
- Selynn is a werewolf agent of the FRU and Burnett's ex-girlfriend. She joined with Burnett to protect Shadow Falls, but her insensitive ways of handling situations made her unaccepted by the inhabitants and she was eventually reassigned.
- Sky Peacemaker is a former camp leader of Shadow Falls Camp. She was a werewolf, who was threatened by the Blood Brothers Gang with her sister's life to help shut down the camp. At the end of Born at Midnight, Sky redeems herself by coming to Kylie and Derek's rescue during their struggle against the Blood Brothers Gang and confessing her crime.
- Clara Parker is Lucas's half-sister who attends Shadow Falls in Whispers at Moonrise. She gets chased by a massive 'fog' and ends up getting rescued by Kylie. Clara accuses her of being behind the whole plot due to her being a witch at the time. In Chosen at Nightfall, she resents Kylie for putting Lucas's life in jeopardy as well as the destruction of his life purpose.
- Ava Kane is a sexy-looking English teacher at Shadow Falls. She is half-witch and half-shape-shifter, though her shape-shifter side is more dominant.
- Monique is Lucas Parker's former-fiancé through an arrange-marriage. She first appears at the end of Whispers at Moonrise during her engagement party. In "Chosen At Nightfall" she encounters Kylie and indicates she was as unhappy about marriage as Lucas or Kylie. She also implies to have had no interest in Lucas until after he broke off the arrangement.
- Chris Whitmore is a student at Shadow Falls. He is the representative of the vampire group at the school and is mostly in charge of pairing up campers/students for their daily activity, Meet Your Campmate Hour. Though he appears playful and funny, he can be serious at times. Like several others, he is assigned as one of Kylie's shadows.
- Blake is Holiday's vampire ex-fiancé. He and Holiday were in love and on their way to marriage before he slept with her sister, Hannah, and then dumped Holiday on their wedding day. He makes his debut appearance in Whispers at Moonrise and is suspected by Burnett to be Hannah's murderer.
- Jenny Yates is Hayden's younger sister and Kylie's newfound friend. After learning to harness the power of invisibility, she escapes from her fellow chameleons in hopes of finding freedom. With help from Kylie, Hayden and Derek, she becomes the first chameleon to enroll Shadow Falls after Kylie, and shows affection toward Derek Lakes, who genuinely returns her feelings.
- Cary Cannon is the history teacher who replaces Collin Warren in Chosen at Nightfall. He is a young but smart werewolf and Fredericka's new love interest, but due to their statuses as teacher and student, Kylie suggests they stay friends for the time being until Fredericka graduates.
- Lee is Della's ex-boyfriend. Because of his strict upbringing, he was meant to marry a pure Chinese girl, but went against his mother's wishes to date Della, a part-Chinese. After Della became a vampire, he pushed her away because of her perpetually cold body temperature, and Della ended their relationship. He had since found a new Chinese girlfriend. They are currently engaged.
- Will is a werewolf student attending Shadow Falls. He is Lucas's closest friend. Whenever Lucas asks him for a favor, he would agree to it. He doesn't believe in the old beliefs about werewolves.
- Mrs. Parker is Lucas's grandmother. She took him in when Lucas's parents didn't want him and took care of him in ways his parents never did. She was a purist regarding the beliefs and traditions of werewolves and wasn't very thrilled when Kylie, a non-werewolf, won Lucas's affection. She helped Lucas contact an elder of the werewolf council in hopes of getting her grandson a chance to join it. Soon after that, she died; however, she still worried for Lucas and asked Kylie to help him through his grief.
