= Circle of Three =

Young adult book series by Michael Thomas Ford, published 2001–02

- So Mote It Be, book 1 of the series
- Author: Isobel Bird
- Cover artist: Cliff Nielsen
- Language: English
- Genre: Fiction, Young Adult, Wicca
- Publisher: Avon Books HarperCollins
- Publication date: February 5, 2001 – March 19, 2002
- Publication place: United States
- Media type: Mass Market Paperback, eBook

Circle Of Three is a series of young adult paperback novels by Michael Thomas Ford under the pseudonym Isobel Bird. It follows the lives of three teenage girls from different social cliques, who come together over a shared interest in witchcraft. It was published between February 5, 2001, and March 19, 2002.

== History ==
Isobel Bird wrote the series to do what many non-fiction books about Wicca fail to do: show how Wiccans experience their religion. Thus, the books cover a wide range of topics related to Wiccan life beyond outright practice, including conflicts with mainstream society, the diversity of the Neo-Pagan community, and legal rights.

Originally released in mass market paperback, the series is out of print, though the books are still available used and as eBooks.The eBooks have bonus material, such as interviews with Isobel Bird, crafts, and magical exercises. Chapter excerpts are available on the HarperCollins website.

The first nine books are available in Germany and France, where the series is known as Magic Circle. It is published in German by Schneiderbuch. The first four books have been published in Castilian Spanish under the series name El Círculo de Fuego, by Editorial Diagonal (Grup 62). The first six books have been published in Italian as Il Cerchio delle Streghe by Gruppo Editorale Armenia.

In 2005, Michael Thomas Ford revealed that he had written the Circle of Three series, using the pen name, Isobel Bird. He also wrote a short story titled "Ever After" for the YA horror anthology 666: The Number of the Beast under that name.

== Reception ==
The critic Rebecca Fisher, writing at Fantasy Literature's Fantasy Book and Audiobook Reviews, said of the series "Unlike the type of witchcraft you would find in Buffy the Vampire Slayer and Charmed, there is a firm grounding in reality, i.e. no levitating, flashes of light or fighting demons. However, Isobel Bird does sometimes slip too far in the opposite direction, as often his stories are rather dull and anti-climatic; furthermore, I have heard complaints that the Wiccan religion isn’t taken seriously enough in these books, portrayed as the sort of trendy, flavour-of-the-month gimmick".

== Synopsis ==
Kate Morgan, a preppy, popular basketball player, checks out a book of spells while doing research for her history paper on medieval witch trials. She casts a love spell, which leads to disaster. She seeks the help of two girls who had previously checked out the spellbook, Annie Crandall, an intellectual, and Cooper Rivers, an alternative outsider. After putting things to rights, the three decide to continue studying Wicca together, which they do at a local New Age store called Crones' Circle. Each of them face various conflicts on her path, both external and internal. Kate is torn between fitting in and embracing the Wiccan path; Annie tries to reconcile her scientific, rational thinking with her new-found intuitive, emotional faith, as well as coming to terms with her parents' deaths years before; the headstrong and independent Cooper has trouble adjusting to both the unpredictability of magic and the novelty of intense friendship.

The series takes place over a period of roughly one year and two months, during which Kate, Annie, and Cooper undergo the traditional year-and-a-day of Wiccan study before being initiated into a coven.

== Books ==
The first four books are told from the point of view of only one girl each. Kate is the center of So Mote It Be and Merry Meet; Cooper is the center of Second Sight; Annie is the center of What the Cards Said. However, starting with Book 5: In the Dreaming, the point of view switches among the three girls, alternating chapters, for the rest of the series.

1. So Mote It Be
2. Merry Meet
3. Second Sight
4. What the Cards Said
5. In the Dreaming
6. Ring of Light
7. Blue Moon
8. The Five Paths
9. Through the Veil
10. Making the Saint
11. The House of Winter
12. Written in the Stars
13. And It Harm None
14. The Challenge Box
15. Initiation

== See also ==
- Sweep (book series)
- Daughters of the Moon
- Blue is for Nightmares
