= The Last Rune =

Series of epic fantasy novels by Mark Anthony

- Beyond the Pale (1998); The Keep of Fire (1999); The Dark Remains (2001); Blood of Mystery (2002); The Gates of Winter (2003); The First Stone (2004)
- Author: Mark Anthony
- Country: United States
- Language: English
- Genre: Fantasy, drama
- No. of books: 6

The Last Rune is a series of six epic fantasy novels written by American author Mark Anthony. It concerns the exploits of two earthlings, tavern owner Travis Wilder and ER doctor Grace Beckett, as well as those of their allies, both throughout their home world of Earth and the otherworld of Eldh. Travis soon discovers that he has a wild talent for the magic of runes, which gives him power over the material world, while Grace learns that she is a witch, with power over nature.

== Books ==
The series comprises the following titles:

=== Beyond the Pale ===
First book of the series. Published in 1998. Travis and Grace are separately transported from Colorado to Eldh and discover their talents for magic. Both are soon sucked into a confrontation between good and evil unlike anything they've ever witnessed.

=== The Keep of Fire ===
Second book of the series. Published in 1999. After a mysterious plague emerges on Earth, Travis returns to Eldh to locate its source. Grace, combating the same plague using magic and medicine, stumbles upon an ancient conspiracy that could spell doom for both worlds.

=== The Dark Remains ===
Third book of the series. Published in 2001. Travis and Grace return to Denver to seek medical aid for the Eldhish knight Beltan, gravely wounded in a battle with a Necromancer. All three soon become targets of a forgotten sect of sorcerers and are forced to ally themselves with the mysterious Seekers.

=== Blood of Mystery ===
Fourth book of the series. Published in 2002. Grace returns to Eldh to find the legendary sword Fellring, the key to defeating her enemy, the dreaded Pale King. Meanwhile, Travis, hurled backwards in time by a demon, must face life (and possibly death) in the Old West.

=== The Gates of Winter ===
Fifth book of the series. Published in 2003. Grace, on Eldh, rallies an army to at last fight the Pale King, while Travis, on Earth, races to stop the Duratek Corporation from tipping the balance in the King's favor. Neither are aware that their separate quests will send them on a collision course with both Earth's Destroyer and Eldh's creator.

=== The First Stone ===
Sixth and final book of the series. Published in 2004. Having at last vanquished the Pale King, Grace attempted to usher Eldh into a new age of peace, while Travis lives quietly in modern-day London. Unfortunately, destiny has one last favor to call in, as Grace and Travis are called to save the universe itself.
