= The Originals (comics) =

2000s American semi-autobiographical graphic novel

- Cover of The Originals, art by Dave Gibbons.

Publication information
- Publisher: Vertigo Comics
- Format: Graphic novel
- Genre: Science fiction
- Publication date: 2004

Creative team
- Created by: Dave Gibbons

The Originals is a graphic novel by Dave Gibbons, published in 2004 by American publisher Vertigo Comics, and republished by Dark Horse Comics on 2018.

The semi-autobiographical story, it deals with members of youth subcultures resembling the Mods and Rockers of 1960s England. Although the setting is mostly identical to post-World War II England, it is an unspecified alternate history where the characters ride on hovering scooters and motorcycles.

Much of the story focuses on violent conflicts between the Originals and their enemies, a gang of bikers which they call "the Dirt". In particular, the Originals and the Dirt battle one another in circumstances very similar to the Second Battle of Hastings.

== Synopsis ==
Lel and Bok are two friends who have recently finished school. Their greatest aspiration is to become members of The Originals, a smartly-dressed gang who ride on floating scooters, called Hovers. Their greatest enemies are the gangs of leather-clad bikers, which they call "the Dirt".

Lel and Bok become members of the Originals after helping the gang in a fight against the Dirt. Lel starts working as a drug dealer for the gang's leader, and the pair soon have enough money for fashionable clothes and Hovers of their own. As the violence between the two gangs escalates and the police ("the Law") begin to crack down on gang activity, however, Lel begins to realize that being an Original is not all fun and games.
