= Delbridge =

Delbridge is a surname. Notable people with the surname include:

- Graham Delbridge (1917–1980), Australian Anglican bishop
- Harrison Delbridge (born 1992), Australian soccer player
- John Delbridge (1564–1639), English merchant and politician
