= Balefire (novel series) =

Fantasy novel series

Balefire is a fantasy novel series by Cate Tiernan, the author of the Sweep (aka Wicca) series. In 2006 the American Library Association picked A Chalice of Wind as one of their notable children's books for that year.

== Plot ==
After seventeen-year-old Thais Allard loses her widowed father in a car crash, she is forced to leave home. She moves to live with a total stranger in New Orleans. There, she meets her identical twin, Clio Martin. Thais soon learns that she and her twin come from a family of witches and that she possesses astonishing powers. The twins must learn to work together.

== Books in the series ==
1. A Chalice of Wind
2. A Circle of Ashes
3. A Feather of Stone
4. A Necklace of Water

== Characters ==
- Thais Allard - One of two twins, Thais was born on November 23 shortly after midnight. She was raised by her father, Michel Allard, in Welsford, Connecticut until he died in a car accident. Thais is the more responsible of the two sisters, always following the rules. Upon discovering the existence of her twin sister, Thais moved in with Petra and Clio, where she began to learn witchcraft. Thais's astrological sign is sagittarius and her element is water. Like Clio, Thais was unknowingly dating Luc-Andre Martin at the same time as her sister and broke up with him upon finding out. At the end of the novel she resumes a friendship with Luc.
- Clio Martin - The second of two twins, Clio was born shortly before midnight on November 22 and was raised by her grandmother/ancestor Petra Martin. Clio is more irresponsible than her twin and at the beginning of the series is also the more knowledgeable about witchcraft. Her astrological sign is scorpio and her element is fire. At the beginning of the series, she begins to date a boy named Luc-Andre Martin and later finds out he was also dating her twin sister at the same time. She later develops a strong attraction to Richard Landry, though she continuously tries to deny it, refusing to let go of what she believed to be love for Luc. In the last book, she gives in to her feelings for Richard, recognizing that Richard and her have an undeniable connection to each other and that Luc does not have the same effect on her anymore. At the end of the series, she chooses to be with Richard.
- Richard Landry - Richard Landry used to be in love with Cerise when he was fifteen, and still refuses to let go of those feelings. He lives with a cynical view on life and always has a hard guard up, never letting himself get too close to others and not really caring for anyone. Until he meets Clio. At the end of the series, he realizes his feelings for Clio are much stronger than anything he felt for Cerise, and they end up together.
- Luc-Andre Martin - Luc-Andre is cousin to Melita, nephew to Petra, and brother of Sophie. He has never truly cared for anyone other than his sister and tends to use people, which changes when he meets Thais, his soul mate. At the end of the series he and Thais resume a tentative friendship.
- Petra Martin - Petra is the grandmother and ancestor of the twins. She separated the twins at birth and had promised their mother, Clemence, that she would keep the twins safe before she died. She is over 240 years old and her element is fire. She is a powerful witch and healer. Petra had two daughters, Melita and Cerise. During a ritual that was performed by her oldest daughter, Melita, her younger daughter Cerise died during childbirth. The ritual, however, made her and eleven other people somewhat immortal.

== Reception ==
Critical reception to the Balefire series has been positive. Of the first entry in the series, the School Library Journal praised Tiernan's characters and Booklist wrote that the "action builds toward a tantalizing twist that will leave readers eager for future books".
