= Tower of Doom (novel) =

Novel by Mark Anthony

- Author: Mark Anthony
- Language: English
- Series: Ravenloft series
- Genre: Fantasy novel
- Published: November 1994 (TSR, Inc.)
- Publication place: United States
- Media type: Print (Paperback)
- Preceded by: Tales of Ravenloft
- Followed by: Baroness of Blood

Tower of Doom is a fantasy horror novel by Mark Anthony, set in the world of Ravenloft, and based on the Dungeons & Dragons game.

== Plot summary ==
Tower of Doom is a novel in which the hunchback Wort tolls the bells in his tower at every execution.

== Reviews ==
- Kliatt
- Backstab #2 (as "La Tour de la Désolation")
