= Sweep (book series) =

Book series by Cate Tiernan

Sweep (Wicca)
- Author: Cate Tiernan
- Language: English
- Series: Sweep
- Subject: Wicca
- Genre: Fiction, Young Adult
- Publisher: Penguin Group
- Publication date: January 29, 2001
- Publication place: United States
- Media type: Paperback

Sweep (Released as Wicca in the UK and Ireland) is a series of young adult fantasy novels written by Cate Tiernan, the first of which, Book of Shadows, was published in 2001. The series follows a teenage girl, Morgan Rowlands, who discovers she is the descendant of a long line of witches, and possesses powerful magic of her own.

== Plot ==
The series is primarily told from the perspective of Morgan Rowlands, who is 16-years-old at the start of the series. During the first story arc Morgan joins a coven led by the popular Cal Blaire and discovers that she is a natural born witch and that she was adopted, as neither of her parents possess magic. Morgan begins to develop a romance with Cal and is introduced to Hunter, a witch from another coven. Her relationship with Cal ends when Morgan discovers that he has betrayed her several times over; he lied to her about being soul mates, he slept with one of her friends, and has been cooperating with his mother Selene's plans to use Morgan for her own ends. Upset, Morgan begins to spend more time with Hunter, eventually developing feelings for him that she is initially reluctant to act upon. The first major story arc ends with Cal dying while attempting to save Morgan from Selene's machinations. Grief stricken, as it was her magic that killed Cal, Selene is unable to control her dark magic and dies.

During the second story arc Morgan experiences a prophetic dream about a ritual sacrifice that The Council of Witches believes is tied to the evil Woodbane clan. Morgan and Hunter travel to New York to investigate the dream. During this time they learn that Morgan's parents were members of Woodbane and that her father Ciaran murdered her mother after she tried to become good. Morgan finally allows herself to accept her love for Hunter, particularly after learning that he is her true soul mate, but breaks off their relationship as she is afraid that she will only cause him ruin due to her bloodline. Morgan is ultimately able to stop her father's evil plans, the source of the dream, by way of his true name, which gives her complete control over him. She and the council use this name to strip him of his powers.

During the third arc Morgan and the others must find a way to defeat the Dark Wave, a dark force that puts all of witches at risk. Hunter is sent out to investigate a witch collecting other witches' true names. During this he manages to reunite with his father, who has been using dark magic to communicate with his recently deceased wife, Hunter's mother. Hunter and Daniel return home with a journal that reveals the origin of the Dark Wave, which had been created by one of Morgan's ancestors. They are ultimately able to defeat the Dark Wave with the help of half-witch Alisa Soto. The main series ends with Hunter and Morgan reaffirming their love for one another, which is strong despite experiencing several challenges.

In the final book of the series, Night's Child, Morgan is thirty-seven years old and living in Scotland, where she works as a healer for the New Charter coven. She has spent the past several years under the belief that Hunter was dead due to a storm at sea, unaware that he was captured by evil witches. In his absence she married another man and had a child, Moira. Morgan once again battles the Dark Wave and is reunited with Hunter. Moira is revealed to be Hunter's child. Morgan had been pregnant when Hunter went missing and had gotten together with her dead husband soon after out of loneliness, so she had assumed it to be her dead husband's.

== Main characters ==
- Morgan Rowlands: Main character and main narrator of books 1 through 9, then partial narrator of books 11, 12, and 14. At the beginning of the series she is 16; in Night's Child she is in her late thirties.
- Cal Blaire: He, along with Hunter Niall, both vie for Morgan's affections.
- Hunter Niall: He is a love interest for Morgan and the father of Morgan's daughter Moira.
- Sky Eventide: Sky is Hunter's cousin and best friend who came with him to Widow's Vale to look out for him.
- Alisa Soto: Alisa is a half-blood witch with the powers of a full-blood witch.
- Ciaran MacEwan: Ciaran is the "mùirn beatha dàn"(soulmate) of Maeve Riordan (Morgan's birth mother)and also the birth father of Morgan.

== Publication history ==
Book Number	Title	Year of Publication	Perspective
01	Book of Shadows	2001	Morgan Rowlands
02	The Coven	2001	Morgan Rowlands
03	Blood Witch	2001	Morgan Rowlands
04	Dark Magic	2001	Morgan Rowlands
05	Awakening	2001	Morgan Rowlands
06	Spellbound	2001	Morgan Rowlands
07	The Calling	2001	Morgan Rowlands
08	Changeling	2001	Morgan Rowlands
09	Strife	2002	Morgan Rowlands
10	Seeker	2002	Hunter Niall
11	Origins	2002	Rose MacEwan
12	Eclipse	2002	Morgan Rowlands and Alisa Soto
13	Reckoning	2002	Alisa Soto
14	Full Circle	2002	Morgan Rowlands and Hunter Niall
Super Edition	Night's Child	2003	3rd person

== Themes ==
In their 2014 PhD dissertation "I Am the Monster: Self and the Monstrous Feminine in Contemporary Young Adult Literature", E Talafuse noted that for the main character, "being a teen witch involves studying the craft, reconciling with one’s family and past, and using one’s powers for protection and spiritual growth." Other themes include the search for identity and what Julia Šarić describes as the "personal fable", where "within a fictional context the story of a previously unknown remarkable history conveys to both the character as well as the intended reader the sense of "specialness" that this construct is meant to give to the adolescent."

== Reception ==
Booklist reviewed the first book in the series. The series has also received reviews from the School Library Journal, The News & Observer, and Pittsburgh Post-Gazette.

=== Awards ===
- Quick Picks for Reluctant Young Adult Readers - Top 10, American Library Association (2002)

== Adaptations ==
In 2010 Variety announced that Universal had picked up the television rights for Sweep. Robert Nelson Jacobs was attached to pen the script and Vince Vaughn was to have produced the show through Wild West Picture Show Productions. No further announcements have been made about the show.

== See also ==
- Balefire
- Circle Of Three
- Daughters of the Moon
