= The Thickety =

American horror fantasy book series

The Thickety is a horror fantasy children's fiction series, written by American author J. A. White.

== Series ==
The first book, A Path Begins, was published on May 6, 2014. In 2015, the book won the CNN Children's Choice Award for Debut Author. The second book, The Whispering Trees, was published March 10, 2015. The third book, Well of Witches, was published on February 23, 2016. The fourth and final book, The Last Spell, was published April 4, 2017.

== Plot ==
The first book, A Path Begins follows a pair of siblings named Kara and Taff Westfall who are mistreated by villagers due to their mother, Helena being killed over accusations of her having practiced witchcraft, you can read about this in the prologue. Their Father is absent, having lost his mind after her mother's death, and as such Kara, as an older teenager, has to take care of herself, her family, and their dying orchard. With a town who has scorned their family, getting by is difficult. Her greatest foe is Grace, the daughter of the town's leader, who is generally liked by the town, and uses that fact to further turn the townspeople against Kara.

One day, Kara discovers a book- a grimoire with the power to seemingly note animal species, and call any animal of that species at will. She is horrified at first, but slowly starts to become drawn to the magic inside. The more spells Kara casts, the more addicted she gets. When Kara falls asleep after casting various spells to relieve her craving for magic, Grace finds her. Grace

The Thickety is a forest that borders the town, known as deadly - or at the very least, madness inducing - to those who enter. The group who live out of the town- the Clearers, keep the forest at bay, burning away are thought of as lesser, and are mostly immigrants to the island.

J. A. White has three sons and teaches kids language arts at a school.
