= Cate Tiernan =

American novelist (born 1961)

- Born: July 24, 1961 (age 65); New Orleans, Louisiana, U.S.
- Occupation: Novelist
- Writing career
- Genres: Fantasy, adventure
- Notable work: Sweep Series

Cate Tiernan (born July 24, 1961) is the pen name of Gabrielle Charbonnet, an American author.

Writing as Cate Tiernan, she is best known for her Sweep series, which follows the Wiccan adventures of a cast of high school students. The stories are sold as the Wicca series in the UK, Belgium, The Netherlands and Australia, and as White Magic (Magie Blanche) in Italy and France. Under her own name, she is chiefly known for children's books in the Princess, American Gold Gymnasts, and Disney Girls series. Since 2005, Charbonnet has collaborated with author James Patterson on multiple "young adult" novels, Sundays at Tiffany's, Witch & Wizard., and multiple books within the Maximum Ride series (uncredited).

== Biography ==
Charbonnet was born in New Orleans, Louisiana in 1961. She began her college education at New York University studying writing and Russian language and literature, then transferred to Loyola University in New Orleans, where she graduated with a degree in Russian. She began her career as an assistant to the head of the Juvenile Audio and Video department at Random House in New York City, where she wrote her first children's books. She also participated in the editing of The Secret Circle by L.J. Smith during this period.

After eight years in New York, Charbonnet and her husband moved back to New Orleans, where they began a family (two children) and she embarked on her Sweep series. While not a Wiccan herself, she asserts that she "can really relate to Wicca", and appreciates its "woman-centeredness and its essentially female identity."

After five years in New Orleans, Charbonnet moved to Durham, North Carolina, where she now lives with her husband Paul, two children, two stepsons, a poodle, and "an unfortunate number of cats."

Charbonnet has written about 75 books under her own name, her pseudonym Cate Tiernan, and miscellaneous other pen names as a ghost writer.

== Selected works ==
- Snakes Are Nothing to Sneeze At (Henry Holt & Company, 1990)
- Boodil, My Dog (Henry Holt & Company, 1992)
- Tutu Much Ballet (Henry Holt & Company, 1994)

=== The Princess Trilogy ===
- Molly's Heart
- The Room in the Attic
- Home at Last

(Scholastic Inc., 1995)

=== American Gold Gymnasts Miniseries ===
- Split Decision
- Balancing Act
- Competition Fever
- The Bully Coach

(Bantam Doubleday Dell, 1996)

=== The Disney Girls Series ===
- One of Us
- Attack of the Beast
- And Sleepy Makes Seven
- A Fish Out of Water
- Cinderella's Castle
- One Pet Too Many
- Adventure in Walt Disney World
- Beauty's Revenge
- Good-bye, Jasmine?
- Princess of Power
- The Gum Race
- The Divine Miss Ariel

(Disney Press, 1998–99)

- 101 Dalmatians: Escape From DeVil Mansion (Disney Press, 1996)
- Hercules: I Made Herc a Hero (Disney Press, 1997)
- The Lion King: Just Can’t Wait to be King (Disney Press, 1998)

=== The Sweep series (writing as Cate Tiernan) ===
- Book of Shadows
- The Coven
- Blood Witch
- Dark Magick
- Awakening
- Spellbound
- The Calling
- Changeling
- Strife
- Seeker
- Origins
- Eclipse
- Reckoning
- Full Circle
- Night's Child

(PutnamPenguin, 2001–2003)

=== Balefire (writing as Cate Tiernan) ===
- A Chalice of Wind
- A Circle of Ashes
- A Feather of Stone
- A Necklace of Water

(PenguinRazorbill, 2005–2007)

=== Immortal Beloved (trilogy as Cate Tiernan) ===
- Immortal Beloved (September 2010)
- Darkness Falls (January 2012)
- Eternally Yours (2012)

=== Birthright (writing as Cate Tiernan) ===
- Darkest Fear (2014)
- Darkest Night (2016) - Never Released
- Darkheart (release date not set)
