= Be Cool, Scooby-Doo! =

American animated television series

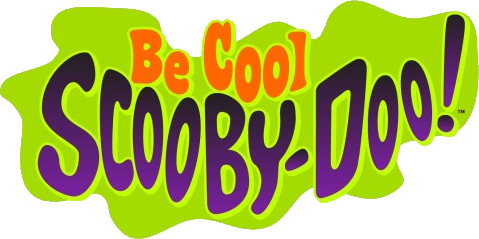
- Genre: Comedy; Mystery; Slapstick
- Based on: Characters by Hanna-Barbera Productions
- Developed by: Jon Colton Barry
- Directed by: Shaunt Nigoghossian; Jeff Mednikow; Andy Thom; James Krenzke; Ron Rubio
- Voices of: Frank Welker; Grey DeLisle; Matthew Lillard; Kate Micucci
- Composer: Jake Monaco
- Country of origin: United States
- Original language: English
- No. of seasons: 2
- No. of episodes: 52 (list of episodes)

Production
- Executive producer: Sam Register
- Producers: Zac Moncrief (season 1); Mark Marek (season 2); Jeff Mednikow (season 2); Monica Mitchell (season 2)
- Editor: Kyle Stafford
- Running time: 22 minutes
- Production company: Warner Bros. Animation

Original release
- Network: Cartoon Network (2015–2016); Boomerang (2017, 2018); Boomerang SVOD (2017)
- Release: October 5, 2015 – March 18, 2018

Related
- Scooby-Doo! Mystery Incorporated (2010–13); Scooby-Doo and Guess Who? (2019–21)

Be Cool, Scooby-Doo! is an American animated television series produced by Warner Bros. Animation as the twelfth incarnation of Hanna-Barbera's Scooby-Doo animated series. In the show, the Scooby-Doo gang decide to travel during their last summer break together, encountering havoc-wreaking monsters along the way. Described as having a more comedic tone than its previous incarnation, Scooby-Doo! Mystery Incorporated, the show employs character traits from the original 1969 series on top of redesigned character models.

The series was announced in March 2014 to premiere on Cartoon Network. However, a promotional image at the 2015 upfront announced the show to air on Boomerang and the news was later confirmed on June 29, 2015. It was originally scheduled to air on Boomerang, but the series instead premiered on Cartoon Network on October 5, 2015. On March 7, 2017, it was announced that the remaining unaired episodes would be released on Boomerang's video on demand streaming service. The final eleven episodes premiered on the Boomerang television network in March 2018 and were added to the Boomerang streaming service on September 26, 2018.

== Plot ==
The redesigned main characters, as they appear in the series

The Scooby-Doo gang decide to travel in the Mystery Machine, seeking fun and adventure during what could possibly be their last summer break together. However, havoc-wreaking monsters seem to be drawn to them, appearing almost every stop of the way. Nonetheless, they do not let it prevent them from completing their journey and, while they are at it, they solve every mystery they encounter.

== Voice cast ==
- Frank Welker – Scooby-Doo and Fred Jones
- Matthew Lillard – Norville "Shaggy" Rogers
- Grey DeLisle – Daphne Blake
- Kate Micucci – Velma Dinkley

== Production ==
Be Cool, Scooby-Doo! was announced in March 2014, along with other reboots of Warner Bros. classics, such as The Tom and Jerry Show and Wabbit. Sam Register, promoted to president of Warner Bros. Animation and Warner Digital Series a month prior, is its supervising producer. The animation direction is performed by Shaunt Nigoghossian, with Richard Lee overseeing art direction. Episodes run for a half-hour.

The twelfth series in the Scooby-Doo franchise, the show was previewed in an article from a Comic-Con edition of TV Guide, writing that it would be less dark than its previous incarnation, Scooby-Doo! Mystery Incorporated. Zac Moncrief, a producer, called it "a more comedic ensemble", with character traits extracted from the original 1969 series. This decision nulled the romantic subplots present in Mystery Incorporated. Scooby-Doo has limited dialogue. Meanwhile, Fred has upgraded the Mystery Machine with modern appliances.

In addition, the series employs redesigned character models for the gang, retaining their original clothes, with a few design tweaks. Moncrief described this as a "simplistic, edgy design to match the comedic styling of this latest version." However, he denied it as "a campy or meta version" of Scooby-Doo.

This marks the first Scooby-Doo television series not to feature Casey Kasem in any capacity; Kasem, who voiced Shaggy from 1969 to 2009, retired from voice acting due to declining health during the production of Mystery Incorporated (in which he portrayed Shaggy's father) and died on June 15, 2014. Kasem's death leaves Frank Welker as the only surviving original cast member still with the franchise. It is also the first series since A Pup Named Scooby-Doo where Velma is voiced by an actress other than Mindy Cohn, marking the debut of Kate Micucci as the character's voice actress.

== Broadcast ==
Be Cool, Scooby-Doo! made its worldwide debut on October 4, 2015, on Boomerang in the United Kingdom and Ireland and premiered on Teletoon in Canada on October 8. The series premiered on Boomerang in Australia on December 28. The series also aired in 2019 on e.tv in South Africa.

== Episodes ==
=== Series overview ===
Season	Episodes		Originally released		
Season	Episodes		First released	Last released	Network
1	26	20	October 5, 2015	March 12, 2016	Cartoon Network
1	26	6	June 20, 2017		Boomerang
2	26	15	September 28, 2017	December 22, 2017	Boomerang VOD
2	26	11	March 8, 2018	March 18, 2018	Boomerang

=== Season 1 (2015–17) ===
The first season premiered on Cartoon Network in the United States on October 5, 2015. After airing twenty out of the twenty-six episodes from the first season, the series was put on a long hiatus following the premiere of "Giant Problems" on March 12, 2016. The final six episodes of the first season were aired on Cartoon Network's sister station Boomerang in an overnight graveyard slot on June 20, 2017.

No. overall	No. in season	Title	Directed by	Written by	Original release date	Prod. code	U.S. viewers (millions)
1	1	"Mystery 101"	Shaunt Nigoghossian	Jon Colton Barry	October 5, 2015	001	1.35
Velma is overjoyed when she gets an interview at Kingston University, a college with one of the highest reputations in the world. However, her dreams are soon wrecked when the ghost of the founder, Elias Kingston, comes back from the grave to scare away students he deems to be unworthy. Chase scene song: "Romp 101" (instrumental) by Jake Monaco Villain(s): Ghost of Elias Kingston / Mitchell and Joe Simmons
2	2	"Game of Chicken"	Jeff Mednikow	Story by : Ken Daly and John Matta; Teleplay by : Ken Daly, John Matta and Jon Colton Barry	October 6, 2015	003	1.08
When Fred gets an exasperated call from his friend, Chuck Mangum, asking for assistance, the gang must save him from a chicken warrior. Chase scene song: "Chicken Picken" (instrumental) by Jake Monaco Villain: The Spirit of the Zatari Warrior / Chuck Mangum
3	3	"All Paws on Deck"	Jeff Mednikow	Story by : Joe Purdy; Teleplay by : Joe Purdy and Jon Colton Barry	October 7, 2015	006	1.15
Velma's extreme aquaphobia doesn't stop the gang from going on Fred's cousin's cruise ship — especially when they have to solve the mystery of a terrifying beast living in the deep. Chase scene song: "I'm Done" by Marc Martel Villains: The Sea Creatures / Thorn and Dahlia
4	4	"Poodle Justice"	Shaunt Nigoghossian	Story by : Joe Ballarini; Teleplay by : Joe Ballarini and Marly Halpern-Graser	October 8, 2015	004	1.43
When the gang goes to the TV set of Poodle Justice, Scooby faces his worst fear ever — talking to a beautiful girl dog. At the same time, a massive gargoyle attacks the set. Chase scene song: "Transylvania Polka" by Vlad Pincus & the Igors, previously used in Scooby-Doo! Frankencreepy Villain: The Gargoyle / Carli
5	5	"Grand Scam"	Jeff Mednikow and Andy Thom	Story by : Kevin A. Kramer; Teleplay by : Kevin A. Kramer and Jon Colton Barry	October 9, 2015	012	1.21
Shaggy takes the gang to the baseball stadium he used to go to when he was a kid, but when a ghost baseball player begins haunting the building, he must quickly become brave, or watch his childhood hangout be condemned forever! Chase scene song: "Swing Batter Batter" by Georgia and The Janasens Villain: The Ghost of Chip Braverton / Dustin Wallswreath
6	6	"Trading Chases"	James Krenzke	Marly Halpern-Graser	October 12, 2015	009	1.01
When Jeff, a tour guide, bets he can lead the gang better than Fred, they both switch places when the gang has to solve the mystery of a ghostly pharaoh. Meanwhile, Daphne takes up falconry. Chase scene song: "Wake Me Up to Say Goodnight" by Finnegan Schwartz Villain: Sobek / Professor Salasar
7	7	"Be Quiet, Scooby-Doo!"	James Krenzke and Andy Thom	Story by : Justin Becker and Steve Clemmons; Teleplay by : Justin Becker, Steve Clemmons and Jon Colton Barry	October 15, 2015	005	1.37
Scooby and the gang visit the Crystal Canopy, which is the home to numerous breathtaking crystal formations and the villainous Crystal Crawler. The problem is, the gang has to stay quiet the whole time, otherwise the crystals will fall! Chase scene song: "Invincible" Villain: Crystal Crawler / Colson McCready
8	8	"Party Like It's 1899"	Andy Thom	Jon Colton Barry	October 19, 2015	002	0.69
The gang is invited to a monster mystery party, where they try solve the mystery of a fake apparition. When a real monster shows up, Daphne and Fred are left to solve the mystery on their own, because no one else will believe them. Chase scene song: "Hit the Ceiling" by Jake Monaco and Ken Stacey Villain: The Headless Count / Bradwick Haverall
9	9	"Screama Donna"	Shaunt Nigoghossian	Jon Colton Barry	October 20, 2015	007	0.69
The gang goes undercover as a band to lure out the Prima Donna, a ghostly musician who doesn't want anyone performing at her theatre. Chase scene song: "Be Yourself" by Josh Keaton (as Bones Malone); Additional songs: "This Is How You Solve The Mystery" by Kate Micucci (as Velma Dinkley) Villain: Ghost of the Prima Donna / Jasper Crawl
10	10	"Kitchen Frightmare"	Shaunt Nigoghossian	Story by : Darren Grodsky and Danny Jacobs; Teleplay by : Jon Colton Barry and Marly Halpern-Graser	October 21, 2015	010	0.76
Shaggy and Scooby must help one of their friends when a Yeti threatens to close his restaurant. Chase scene song: "Appetite" by Finnegan Schwartz Villain: The Yeti / Jeff Howard
11	11	"Me, Myself, and A.I."	Shaunt Nigoghossian	Story by : Kevin Fleming and Robert Janas; Teleplay by : J.M. DeMatteis and Jon Colton Barry	October 22, 2015	013	0.81
The gang visits a technology company to solve the mystery of an evil robot who has been wreaking havoc. Chase scene song: "Bad, Bad Dream" by Jake Monaco Villain: Butler 3000 (hacked and controlled by Mallory O'Neill)
12	12	"Area 51 Adjacent"	James Krenzke	Story by : Tom Konkle; Teleplay by : Tom Konkle and Jon Colton Barry	October 23, 2015	011	0.87
The gang is mistaken for aliens and are taken to Area 53 for questioning. Meanwhile, when a real alien goes on the loose, the gang must try to figure out a way to escape and capture the extraterrestrial. Villain: The Alien / General Stall
13	13	"Where There's a Will, There's a Wraith"	Jeff Mednikow	Story by : Duane Capizzi; Teleplay by : Duane Capizzi and Jon Colton Barry	October 28, 2015	015	1.11
In an adaption of the Scooby-Doo, Where Are You episode A Night of Fright Is No Delight, Scooby inherits a fortune from a recently deceased rich man, but only if he and the gang stay the night in the man's mansion with a terrifying wraith. Chase scene song: "How Do You Do?" Villains: The Phantoms / Ruby and Trudy Lutz
14	14	"Scary Christmas"	Andy Thom	Jon Colton Barry	December 10, 2015	019	1.35
The gang visits the town of Rockwellville in search of a Christmas mystery, but all they find is a pterodactyl who seems to have nothing to do with Christmas. Meanwhile, Daphne, who is tired of having her December 25th birthday overshadowed year after year, tries to convince the gang to celebrate her birthday instead of Christmas. Note: This episode was scheduled to air on November 30, 2015, but was pulled due to the premiere of Long Live the Royals. Villain(s): The Pterodactyl / David, Alistair Leventhal
15	15	"If You Can't Scooby-Doo the Time, Don't Scooby-Doo the Crime"	Jeff Mednikow	Story by : Steve Clemmons; Teleplay by : Steve Clemmons, Jon Colton Barry and Marly Halpern-Graser	February 6, 2016	008	1.17
Fred takes the gang to visit The Vault, an old prison that is haunted by the ghost of Stealin' Stan, who died trying to escape from the prison. Note: This episode was released digitally on iTunes on October 30, 2015, but it was quickly removed. Chase scene song: "I Don't Know About You" by Finnegan Schwartz Villain(s): The Ghost of Stealin' Stan / Stealin Stan, Warden Bowman
16	16	"Gremlin on a Plane"	James Krenzke	Story by : Amy Wolfram; Teleplay by : Amy Wolfram and Jon Colton Barry	February 13, 2016	014	0.97
The gang goes aboard the Air Gigantica and tries to stop a gremlin from sabotaging the flight. Meanwhile, after the pilot quits, Daphne has to try to land the plane safely before it crashes. Villain: The Gremlin / Ed Johnson
17	17	"Sorcerer Snacks Scare"	Shaunt Nigoghossian and Andy Thom	Story by : Josie Campbell and Marly Halpern-Graser; Teleplay by : Josie Campbell, Marly Halpern-Graser and Jon Colton Barry	February 20, 2016	016	0.95
The gang goes to the Sorcerer Snacks factory, where a real sorcerer is scaring everyone away. Meanwhile, Fred finds he can get Shaggy and Scooby to do anything he wants with a box of Sorcerer Snacks (a precursor to Scooby Snacks). Villain: The Sorcerer / Piero
18	18	"Saga of the Swamp Beast"	James Krenzke	Story by : Tab Murphy; Teleplay by : Tab Murphy and Jon Colton Barry	February 27, 2016	017	1.14
The gang visits a bayou in New Orleans, where a swamp monster is frightening away anyone who comes into his swamp. Meanwhile, Daphne pretends to be a vampire. Villains: The Swamp Monster and the Gentleman Bandit / Dwayne
19	19	"Be Cold, Scooby-Doo!"	Jeff Mednikow	Story by : Steve Clemmons; Teleplay by : J.M. DeMatteis and Jon Colton Barry	March 5, 2016	018	1.05
The gang's trip to a ski resort is interrupted by a snow monster terrorizing the tourists. Meanwhile, Daphne attempts to get revenge on Fred for hitting her with a snowball three years ago by planning a snowball attack. Villain: The Snow Monster / Heidi Ho Swift
20	20	"Giant Problems"	Jeff Mednikow	Story by : J.M. DeMatteis; Teleplay by : J.M. DeMatteis and Jon Colton Barry	March 12, 2016	020	1.05
Daphne takes the gang to her family's ancient castle, which her mother forgot she had. After a one-eyed giant begins trying to scare her out of the castle, the gang is on the case, but things become challenging when Fred insists on wearing knight armor throughout the entire mystery, and Daphne speaks in an Irish accent which irks Velma.By transforming the mystery machine into a robot, they fight the giant Villain: The Giant / A giant robot piloted by Colin McQuaid
21	21	"Eating Crow"	James Krenzke	Story by : Josie Campbell; Teleplay by : Josie Campbell, Jon Colton Barry and Marly Halpern-Graser	June 20, 2017	021	N/A
The gang goes to a farm, where Fred develops a crush on Beth (voiced by Erica Lindbeck), a farmer's daughter. When a living scarecrow appears, Fred tries to impress Beth with his mystery solving skills, while Velma gets severe hay allergies and Daphne begins hoarding animals as "pets" after becoming jealous of Shaggy and Scooby's relationship. Villain(s): The Scarecrow(s) / Old Tom and Jonathan Chase scene song: "Old Stomping Grounds" By: Adam Levin, James Bairian, and Louis Castle
22	22	"I Scooby-Dooby Do"	Andy Thom	Story by : Josie Campbell and Marly Halpern-Graser; Teleplay by : Josie Campbell and Jon Colton Barry	June 20, 2017	022	N/A
After the ghost of the Cliff Bride begins haunting a wedding that the gang is attending, they must go to extreme lengths to try to keep the bride, who is very superstitious, from finding out. However, this proves very challenging when the ghost seems to appear everywhere that the bride is. Meanwhile, Daphne becomes very wrapped up in the ideology of wedding traditions and Shaggy worries obsessively about his best man speech. Villain(s): The Ghost of the Cliff Bride / Nate and Kimmy's mothers
23	23	"El Bandito"	James Krenzke	Story by : Tom Pugsley; Teleplay by : Tom Pugsley and Jon Colton Barry	June 20, 2017	023	N/A
Fred takes the gang to Mexico so they can experience the local Day of the Dead festivities. A mystery quickly pops up involving a long-dead historical figure named El Bandito, causing Fred to want to make himself a legend just like El Bandito. During the mystery, Daphne believes her deceased Aunt Cookie is communicating with her somehow. Villain: The Spirit of El Bandito / Gustavo
24	24	"Into the Mouth of Madcap"	Jeff Mednikow	Story by : Duane Capizzi; Teleplay by : Duane Capizzi and Jon Colton Barry	June 20, 2017	024	N/A
After Daphne agrees to babysit her friend's son, Wayne, the gang ends up going to an amusement park where an insane killer clown is lurking. Daphne attempts to focus on allowing Wayne to have a good time, but the rest of the gang investigates the park and tries to solve the mystery of Madcap, the killer clown. Villain: Madcap the Killer Clown / Oopsy
25	25	"The Norse Case Scenario"	Andy Thom	Story by : Josie Campbell and Marly Halpern-Graser; Teleplay by : Josie Campbell and Jon Colton Barry	June 20, 2017	025	N/A
Fred attempts to hone the gang's mystery solving skills by taking them out camping in the wilderness. A perfect mystery opportunity soon comes along when they discover that viking ghosts have scared away all the tourists from camping in the area. However, the gang has to avoid the park ranger in the process, or risk being sent to "Forest Jail" forever. Villains: The Viking Ghosts / Ranger Mark, Donald and Edith
26	26	"The People vs. Fred Jones"	James Krenzke	Story by : H. Caldwell Tanner; Teleplay by : Jon Colton Barry	June 20, 2017	026	N/A
Fred is put on trial after he is wrongfully accused of dressing up as a toxic waste mutant. The trial goes further awry after Fred is accused of inventing every mystery he has ever solved. Though Daphne agrees on being Fred's defense lawyer, her and the rest of the gang's antics serve no help to Fred, who risks being put away in prison if charged with the crime. Villain: The Toxic Mutant / Dayton Knight

=== Season 2 (2017–18) ===
On March 7, 2017, it was announced that the rest of Be Cool, Scooby-Doo! would be premiering exclusively on the streaming service for Boomerang, a sister channel of Cartoon Network. The season premiered on the streaming service on September 28, 2017. Despite this, the final eleven episodes of the season premiered on the Boomerang television network. The season concluded on March 18, 2018.

No. overall	No. in season	Title	Directed by	Written by	Original release date	Prod. code	U.S. viewers (millions)
27	1	"Some Fred Time"	Jeff Mednikow	Jon Colton Barry	December 21, 2017	027	N/A
After Fred goes on a crazed trapping spree which ends in police intervention, the gang decides he needs a long rest, so they take him up to Daphne's beach cabin. Unfortunately, at that same time, a mythological shark monster named Dorsal Foot comes up on land and begins terrorizing the beach. The gang attempts to keep this from Fred, but the task becomes excessively difficult when Fred becomes suspicious and paranoid of everyone around him. Chase scene song: "Ever After" by Pretty Good Music Band Villain(s): Dorsal Foot / Bellington, Charlie Potts
28	2	"There Wolf"	James Krenzke	Jon Colton Barry	December 21, 2017	028	N/A
The gang brings Scooby to an old Gothic animal hospital after he loses all desire to eat. While the doctor attends to him, the rest of the gang discovers that a werewolf is running around the halls of the hospital, and as usual, they try to solve the mystery while Scooby regains his strength. Meanwhile, Daphne decides to become a mime, much to the annoyance of the rest of her friends. Villain: The Werewolf / Miguel
29	3	"Renn Scare"	Andy Thom	Ben Joseph	December 21, 2017	029	N/A
The gang goes with Velma to a Renaissance fair which she often went to as a kid. Disaster quickly strikes when a ghostly jester appears and tries to overthrow the king. The gang is on the case once again, but this time, they must solve the mystery with only items which existed in the time of the Renaissance. Villain: The Jester / Harvey
30	4	"How to Train Your Coward"	Jeff Mednikow	Jon Colton Barry	December 21, 2017	030	N/A
Shaggy and Scooby become badly injured after a run-in with a monster, and as a result, they decide to quit the gang forever. Before they leave, however, they attempt to find replacements for themselves and provide on-the-job training, which proves difficult when the gang inadvertently drives into a town plagued by a vicious vampire. Shaggy and Scooby also discover that replacing themselves may not be quite as simple as they previously believed. Villain(s): The Vampire / Sheriff Boon, Paco
31	5	"Worst in Show"	James Krenzke	J.M. DeMatteis	December 21, 2017	031	N/A
When the gang allows Scooby to pick their latest destination, he chooses a dog show. Unbeknownst to them, a giant houndbeast is going on a rampage around the dog show and threatens to cancel it. Scooby decides to enter the show to solve the mystery, with Daphne as his trainer, but he seemingly cannot earn the other dogs' respect. Additionally, Shaggy and Velma oddly switch personalities, and Fred pretends to be a big-shot millionaire in order to impress the other dog owners. Chase scene song: "Toe to Toe" by Luca Ellis Villain(s): The Houndbeast / Doby, Estelle Brady
32	6	"Mysteries on the Disorient Express"	Ron Rubio	Tom Konkle	December 21, 2017	032	N/A
Mystery and mayhem abounds when the gang tries to take a monster-free train trip on the Disorient Express. It turns out that not one, but eight mythological creatures are hiding all over the train, and the gang has to figure out how each creature relates to the overall mystery at hand. Meanwhile, Daphne tries to heighten her senses by blocking them off one at a time. Villains: The Grim Reaper, Mummy, Tengu, Tarasque, Tzitzimitl, Haniver, Manticore and Hemogoblin / Tobar Jacobs, Ichi Lee and other spies from different countries
33	7	"Halloween"	Andy Thom	Jon Colton Barry	September 28, 2017	033	N/A
While trick-or-treating with his cousin Scott and a friend when he was little, Fred has a scarring experience when he is ambushed by an evil witch near an abandoned cabin. Eleven years later, Fred and the gang run into the very same witch on Halloween night in another town. As the gang attempts to solve the mystery of the witch, they must also convince Fred that he is incorrect in his belief that a mystery cannot be solved on Halloween night. Chase scene song: "Spooky Scary" by Pretty Good Music Band Villain(s): Baba Yaga / Mr. and Mrs. Clune
34	8	"The Curse of Kaniaku"	James Krenzke	Darrick Bachman	December 21, 2017	034	N/A
Daphne becomes a viral sensation when the gang visits Japan. While touring with Velma's Japanese friend, they discover that the city is being attacked by a gigantic crab monster named Kaniaku. The gang has to solve the mystery, while dealing with Velma's jealousy towards Daphne's sudden popularity. Villain: Kaniaku / Mr. Kagawa
35	9	"Vote Velma"	Andy Thom	Kevin Kramer	December 21, 2017	035	N/A
The gang visits the town of Littlefield just in time for an upcoming mayoral election. After the ghost of the town founder scares one of the mayoral candidates off, Velma makes a bold move and decides to run for mayor in order to lure out the ghost. She quickly realizes that making decisions in politics and catering to the voters' desires is a lot tougher than it appears. Villain: The Ghost of Amos Littlefield / Violet Oberon
36	10	"Scroogie Doo"	Ron Rubio	Tom Konkle	November 30, 2017	036	N/A
The gang visits Britain so Velma can give a speech, but they are quickly sidetracked by a man named Scrooge, who claims to be plagued by three phantoms. While trying to solve the mystery, Velma quickly discovers that the ghosts aren't there for Scrooge, but rather for her. Giving the Dickens classic A Christmas Carol a new spin, the three ghosts of Christmas try to show Velma that the gang is holding her back in life. Velma must make the difficult decision of whether she wants to stay with the gang and continue to solve mysteries, or go off and pursue her dreams on her own. Villain(s): The Spirit of Jacob Marley, The Ghosts of Christmas Past, Present and Future / Dr. Buggly
37	11	"In Space"	James Krenzke	Will Schifrin	December 22, 2017	037	N/A
Fred makes a horrible parking decision when he accidentally parks on a space station's loading dock. The gang is accidentally launched into space because of Fred's ignorant choice, and have to try to make their way back to Earth. Things get even worse when a mysterious alien virus contaminates the crew, turning them into horrible skull-headed aliens. Villain: Skull Aliens / Officer Soung
38	12	"Doo Not Disturb"	James Krenzke	Tom Konkle	December 22, 2017	038	N/A
To get out of a raging snowstorm, the gang checks in at The Good Son Inn. After they arrive, they learn that the hotel manager has very peculiar rules which he has placed on signs all around the hotel. The gang quickly finds out that there is a very scary penalty for breaking his rules: a horrifying visit from the hotel manager's deceased mother. Villain: The Ghost of Mother / Josh Stanley
39	13	"Silver Scream"	Ron Rubio	Kevin Kramer	December 22, 2017	039	N/A
The gang goes on a tour around the infamous Fletcher Studios in Hollywood, with Daphne acting as their tour guide. However, a mystery soon arises when the ghost of the long-dead silent film star Archie Barnes comes back from the dead to prevent his unreleased film from being seen. The gang tries to solve the mystery, while having to dodge Barnes's vengeful ghost, after they are the first ones in the world to watch his never-before-seen movie. Villain: The Ghost of Archie Barnes / Lori Logan
40	14	"Fright of Hand"	Andy Thom	Kyle Stafford	December 22, 2017	040	N/A
Fred joins a magician's club and takes on the alter ego "Freddy or Not" in order to join. Fred's first-ever performance is tragically ruined by a gigantic mutant rabbit named Mr. Wiggly, and the gang takes it on themselves to solve the mystery, so Fred can live out his dream of becoming a famous magician. Villain(s): The Mutant Rabbit / Greg and Saul Twinkelshine
41	15	"Greece is the Word"	James Krenzke	J.M. DeMatteis	December 22, 2017	041	N/A
Velma finds a mysterious ancient scroll while trapped by a harpie in an ancient building, which highlights the escape route. In order to escape, the gang has to decode the old Grecian messages, which results in a flashback to the gang's counterparts from Greece. It seems the ancient Grecian gang has to solve the mystery of a legendary spider monster named Arachne whom is terrorizing their village. This thousand-year-old plot eventually leads to the present-day gang formulating a plan to escape from the evil harpie. Villains: Arachne / Aeslop and Prince Shlemielius, Harpie / Unnamed man
42	16	"American Goth"	Andy Thom	Michael Ludy	March 8, 2018	042	N/A
Shaggy runs into his old childhood crush Amelia, who has become a goth. Though initially skeptical of Amelia's new identity, Shaggy takes the opportunity to learn more about the goth culture. After Amelia takes Shaggy to a goth club, a plant monster attacks and the gang attempts to solve the mystery. Villain: The Plant Monster / Dorbin
43	17	"Omelettes are Forever"	Ron Rubio	Jon Colton Barry	March 9, 2018	043	N/A
Super villains named Bubby and Minus attempt to forever eliminate the meal of breakfast, which causes British secret agent Jenny Vex to attempt to stop them. Along the way, Jenny runs into the gang and enlists their efforts in stopping Bubby and Minus. Chase scene song: "Dreaming of Chocolate" by Marisa De Silva Villains: Minus / Dillingsley, Bubby, The Sweater Men
44	18	"Ghost in the Mystery Machine"	James Krenzke	Jon Colton Barry	March 10, 2018	044	N/A
Fred and the gang return to the location of a mystery they had previously solved. Whilst there, the Mystery Machine becomes possessed and tries to kill the gang. The gang tries to run for their lives, while Fred copes with the loss of his precious Mystery Machine. Villain(s): The Possessed Mystery Machine / Dr. Blum and Lori Walsh
45	19	"Naughty or Ice"	Ron Rubio	Libby Ward	March 11, 2018	045	N/A
Daphne brings the gang to her parents' ice hotel, where a caveman has been discovered. After the Ice Man thaws out and begins scaring all the customers away, the gang tries to help Daphne and her family capture the caveman. However, it appears that Daphne may not want their help, as she begins to act very strangely and seems to be on her own mission. Villain: The Ice Man / Ms. Anja
46	20	"Night of the Upsetting Shorts"	Andy Thom	Kyle Stafford	March 12, 2018	046	N/A
Shaggy visits Florida with the gang, so he can see his grandma in her nursing home. In a bold attempt to try to impress her, Fred and Daphne pretend that Daphne is Shaggy's girlfriend and that he is the leader of the gang. Meanwhile, an Ape Man begins rampaging around the nursing home, a tropical storm hits the area, and Fred wears a pair of very "upsetting" shorts. Additional song: "Singing for Our Lives" by Frank Welker and Kate Micucci Villain: The Ape Man / Grandma Rogers
47	21	"Junkyard Dogs"	James Krenzke	Thomas Krajewski	March 13, 2018	047	N/A
Scooby runs into his old kennel mate, Axel, who has become part of the police K-9 unit. Axel begins acting like he is better than Scooby, prompting Shaggy and him to try to solve the mystery themselves to prove Axel wrong. Meanwhile, Daphne pretends to be Fred for a day, whilst the gang solves the mystery of a trash monster terrorizing the local garbage dump. Villain: The Trash Monster / Officer Mike
48	22	"Protein Titans 2"	Andy Thom	Kyle Stafford	March 14, 2018	048	N/A
The gang visits the Brainsplosion video game company, after they offer Velma a high-paying position working on a new video game Protein Titans 2. However, she is reluctant to accept the position, because it would mean no longer traveling with the gang. Meanwhile, the ghost chef, a villain from the Protein Titans 2 comes to life and the gang tries to solve the mystery, whilst Velma is making her decision. Villain: The Ghost Chef / Zara
49	23	"World of Witchcraft"	Ron Rubio	Tab Murphy	March 15, 2018	049	N/A
The gang visits the town of Salem, Massachusetts to attend a historical festival on the Salem Witch Trials. Almost immediately after they arrive, a demon begins plaguing the town of Salem. The town's citizens become frightened that the demon was sent by a witch, punishing them for what happened at the Witch Trials hundreds of years ago. The gang tries to solve the mystery, only for them to be accused of being witches themselves, due to Daphne's protesting of the oppressive stereotyping of witches. Villain(s): The Demon of Salem / Carl and Mrs. Baker
50	24	"Professor Huh? Part 1"	James Krenzke	Jon Colton Barry	March 16, 2018	050	N/A
Fred is called upon to help solve the mystery of Professor Huh?, a mysterious figure who has escaped from a high-security prison. However, it seems Fred's childhood friend Rose, who now has her own mystery solving-gang, is competing against Fred to solve the mystery first. As the mystery progresses, the gang makes a shocking discovery that Professor Huh? is actually Fred's father, who was sent to jail years ago by Rose. Villain: Professor Huh? / Donald Jones Note: This episode, along with the next episode, serves as the series' chronological finale.
51	25	"Professor Huh? Part 6 ¾"	Ron Rubio	Story by : Jon Colton Barry; Teleplay by : Jon Colton Barry and Kyle Stafford	March 17, 2018	051	N/A
The gang and Professor Huh? escape on a rocket, leading Rose to frame the gang, and report to the police that they were the ones that let Professor Huh? out of prison. The rocket quickly crashes, forcing the gang to evacuate. Professor Huh? appears to have not escaped the rocket, leaving his fate unknown. After the gang returns to the ground, they must go incognito to avoid police custody. The gang tries to figure out a way to clear their names, while also exposing Rose and her gang for setting them up. Villains: Professor Huh? / Donald Jones, Rose and Her Henchmen Note: This episode, along with the previous episode, serves as the series' chronological finale.
52a	26a	"Pizza O'Possum's"	Jeff Mednikow	Jeff Mednikow	March 18, 2018	052A	N/A
The gang goes to an arcade which Shaggy frequented in his childhood, so he can finally get Pizza Pup, a stuffed dog prize that he has been desiring since he was a kid. However, what they don't realize is that the arcade's deactivated robotic mascot, Pizza O'Possum, has come to life and wants to frighten everyone away from the arcade. Villain: Pizza O'Possum / Lydia Note: This segment has a running time of 11 minutes, as opposed to the normal 22 minute format of the series. It, along with "The Curse of Half-Beard's Booty", comprise one 22 minute episode.
52b	26b	"The Curse of Half-Beard's Booty"	Jeff Mednikow	Jeff Mednikow	March 18, 2018	052B	N/A
Fred takes the gang to a seafood restaurant. Their plans for a much-needed relaxing dinner abruptly end when they discover their waiter is none other than Captain Cutler, a previous villain who has eluded them. It seems though, that Captain Cutler has changed his ways, when he requests their help in capturing Half-Beard, a ghost who is scaring all the customers away from Cutler's restaurant. Villains: The Ghost of Half-Beard / Karen, Oft-Injured Willy and Captain Cutler Note: This segment has a running time of 11 minutes, as opposed to the normal 22-minute format of the series. It, along with "Pizza O'Possum's", comprise one 22-minute episode.

== Home media ==
=== Region 1 ===
DVD name	# of episodes	Release date
Be Cool, Scooby-Doo! – Season One, Part One: Spooky Kooky Fun!	13	February 23, 2016
Be Cool, Scooby-Doo! – Season One, Part Two: Teamwork Screamwork	13	January 16, 2018

=== Region 2 ===
DVD name	# of episodes	Release date
Be Cool, Scooby-Doo!: Season One, Volume One	7	April 4, 2016
Be Cool, Scooby-Doo!: Season One, Volume Two	6	October 10, 2016

=== Region 4 ===
DVD name	# of episodes	Release date
Be Cool, Scooby-Doo!: Season One, Volume One	13	May 11, 2016
Be Cool, Scooby-Doo!: Season One, Volume Two	13	January 11, 2017
