= Issy Knopfler =

English actress

- Occupations: Actress; Producer
- Years active: 2021-present
- Television: The Wayfinders

Issy Knopfler (born 1997 or 1998) is an English television actress and producer. Her television credits include Before We Die (2021-2023) and a lead role in The Wayfinders (2025-present). She is the daughter of actress Kitty Aldridge and musician Mark Knopfler.

== Career ==
In 2019, she filmed a short film directed by Jodhi May entitled Everything I Ever Wanted to Tell My Daughter About Men in which she appeared alongside James Purefoy.

In 2021, Knopfler appeared as Bianca in Channel 4 series Before We Die alongside Lesley Sharp. She also appeared in the second series, broadcast in 2023. In 2022, she played Alice alongside Emilia Fox and Tara Fitzgerald in Signora Volpe.

In 2023, she played forensic science student Chloe in series 26 of long-running drama series Silent Witness. Knopfler has a lead role in The Wayfinders with Mackenzie Crook, Sam Buchanan and Rowan Robinson. Alongside Buchanan, she launched her own independent production company, Silent Knight, in 2025.

== Personal life ==
She is the daughter of Dire Straits musician Mark Knopfler and writer and actress Kitty Aldridge. She has a younger sister, Katya. The family lived in the New Forest.

== Filmography ==
Key
†	Denotes works that have not yet been released

Year	Title	Role	Notes
2021	Everything I Ever Wanted to Tell My Daughter About Men	Young Woman	Short
2021-2023	Before We Die	Bianca	11 episodes
2022-2024	Signora Volpe	Alice	3 episodes
2023	Silent Witness	Serena Ross	2 episodes
2025-2026	The Wayfinders	Aurora	Lead role
TBA	Arsenic Lane†	Molly Starace	
