= Uittenbogaard =

Uittenbogaard is a Dutch toponymic surname. The surname has at least 60 different spellings, including Uijt de Boogaardt, Uijttenboogaard, Uit den Bogaard, Uitenbogaart, Uittenbogerd, Uyttenboogaart, and Wtenbogaert. The modern Dutch spelling would be "uit de boomgaard', meaning "(out) from the orchard". The surname has a very high number of alternative forms. People with this surname or one of its variant spellings include:

- Albert Uytenbogaardt (born 1930), South African football goalkeeper
- Dirk Uittenbogaard (born 1990), Dutch rower
- Ingeborg Uyt den Boogaard (1930–2021), Dutch film actress
- Johannes Wtenbogaert (1557–1644), Dutch Remonstrant leader
- John Henri uit den Bogaard (1911–1993), Dutch children's book writer and photographer
- Jan Uytenbogaart (1897–1964), Dutch chemist
- Marthijn Uittenbogaard (born 1972), Dutch politician and pedophile
- Roelof Uytenbogaardt (1933–1998), South African architect
- Theo Uittenbogaard (1946–2022), Dutch radio & TV-producer

== See also ==
- Van den Boogaard, Dutch surname with the same origin and meaning
- Uytenbogaardtite, sulfide mineral named after the Dutch mineralogist Willem Uytenbogaardt (1918–2012)
