= Janice Okoh =

British playwright

- Education: Keele University; University of East Anglia
- Occupations: Playwright, screenwriter, novelist
- Writing career
- Notable work: Three Birds
- Notable awards: Bruntwood Prize for Playwriting

Janice Okoh is a British playwright, screenwriter, and novelist.

== Early life ==
Okoh is from Lewisham, South-East London, the daughter of Nigerian parents Gladys and Hezekiah Okoh from Delta State. Okoh attended a local primary school and then boarded at St Michael's School for Girls in Limpsfield near Oxted. She studied law at Keele University. Before becoming a playwright, she worked at law firms in the city for seven years and as a teacher. Okoh pursued a Master of Arts (MA) in Creative Writing at the University of East Anglia (UEA).

== Career ==
Her first play Egusi Soup was produced in 2012 by Menagerie Theatre/Soho Theatre. In 2011 Okoh won the Bruntwood Prize for Playwriting for her play Three Birds (which would be produced in 2013), which she entered under a pseudonym Ebenezer Foot. The play was also short-listed for the Verity Bargate Award and the Alfred Fagon Award. She adapted the play for the television series Just Act Normal, broadcast on BBC Three from 16 April 2025. In April 2026, Just Act Normal won the 2026 BAFTA Award for Emerging Talent: Fiction.

Okoh's play The Gift (2020) tells the story of the Egbado princess Sarah Bonetta who was given to Queen Victoria as a gift, and raised as her god-daughter. The play opened at the Belgrade Theatre, Coventry in January 2020 before moving on to the Theatre Royal Stratford East. It was a finalist for the Susan Smith Blackburn Prize. She has also written for radio, including an adaptation of Malorie Blackman’s Noughts & Crosses.

Okoh has also written for television, contributing episodes of Doctors, Hetty Feather and On the Edge. She joined the writing team for series 2 of ITV's Sanditon.

Her debut novel, Girl Number 8 is set to release in 2027 by Berkley Books, an imprint of Penguin Publishing Group. In 2023, an early draft of the novel titled, The Girl With Light Eyes was shortlisted for The Bath Novel Award. In the same year, the draft was selected as one of the winners of the Inaugural Mary Prince Memorial Award for the Black Writers Guild.

== Works ==
=== Stage plays ===
- Top Brass. Theatre 503, 2010.
- Egusi Soup. Nick Hern, 2012.
- Three Birds, 2013.
- The Gift, 2020.

=== Radio plays ===
- Carnival. Aired on BBC Radio R, 2010.
- Reunion. Aired on BBC Radio 4 Extra, 2011.
- Noughts & Cross. Aired on BBC Radio 4, 2014.
- Silk: The Clerks Room. Aired on BBC Radio 4, 2014.
- The Awakening. Aired on BBC Radio 4, 2014.
- The Heart of a Woman. Aired on BBC Radio 4, 2015.
- Red Earth, Red Sky. Aired on BBC Radio 4. 2019.
- Half of a Yellow Sun. Aired on BBC Radio 4, 2020.
- Cane. Aired on BBC Radio 4, 2020.

=== Novels ===
- Girl Number 8. Berkley Books. 2027. ISBN 9798217191215
