= Matilda Freeman =

British actress (born 2004)

- Born: 2004 (age 21–22)
- Education: The Queen's School, Chester
- Occupation: Actress
- Years active: 2015–present
- Television: Coronation Street

Matilda Freeman (born 2004) is a British actress. She has appeared in various short films. In 2017, after a guest appearance on Doctors, Freeman began playing the regular role of Summer Spellman on the soap opera Coronation Street. For her work on the soap, Freeman was nominated for an Inside Soap Award and a British Soap Award. She also played a leading role in the 2019 feature film The Last Boy. Freeman left the soap in 2020 to explore other acting opportunities and the role was subsequently recast. She has since appeared in Alma's Not Normal, Passenger, How to Get to Heaven from Belfast and The Blame.

== Life and career ==
Matilda Freeman was born in 2004. She is from Mickle Trafford in Cheshire West and Chester. For her education, Freeman attended The Queen's School in Chester. Freeman was initially not interested in acting but fell into by "accident" when she decided to audition for the BBC drama Our Zoo after some girls in her class teased her that she would not be able to audition due to being so shy. She ended up getting down to the final five out of 1600 auditionees and was pencilled in for the role, but ultimately did not receive it due to her lack of experience. Freeman then joined the Television Workshop and began auditioning for other roles. Freeman and her parents then realised that acting could be Freeman's "thing" and Freeman recalled that people were supportive of her.

In 2015, Freeman had a leading role in a short film and directed a short trailer with her schoolfriends for the Chester Performs Film Festival. In 2016, Freeman portrayed the role of Esther in the ITV2's sitcom television pilot Dropperz and that same year she also filmed scenes for the feature film The Last Boy, which was released in 2019. Speaking of The Last Boy, her first feature film, Freeman called it an "absolute dream to work on" and recalled, "The filming days were very long but the entire cast and crew were so lovely that it didn't even feel like work". Freeman felt lucky receiving acting roles at a young age, explaining, "I love how you can just lose yourself in another character for a while. You have to be really patient with filming as there are lots of takes but I really enjoyed the atmosphere and meeting so many interesting people who have done so much in their lives". Freeman has also appeared in various short films. In 2017, Freeman appeared in an episode of Doctors as Chantelle Briggs.

From 2017 to 2020, Freeman portrayed Summer Spellman on the ITV soap opera Coronation Street. She appeared in 147 episodes and her first appearance aired in June 2017. Freeman called joining the soap "exciting" and believed that working in a soap was different from her previous projects; she had not watched Coronation Street but "was very aware of the importance it had in a lot of people’s lives". Freeman's character was introduced as the new adoptive daughter of established characters Todd Grimshaw (Bruno Langley) and Billy Mayhew (Daniel Brocklebank) – becoming the first same-sex couple to raise a child in the soap opera – after the death of her father Drew Spellman (Tom Goodwin) and she was involved in a storyline where she collapsed after taking drugs. When she joined the soap, she felt nervous but found working there "fun" and praised her colleagues for being very nice. Freeman enjoyed working with Langley and Brocklebank and enjoyed doing mixture of funny and emotional scenes, though she believed that her "speciality" was crying. Whilst on the soap, Freeman became friends with her co-star Elle Mulvaney (Amy Barlow), who Freeman opined had been the most welcoming. For her role as Summer, Freeman was longlisted and later shortlisted for "Best Young Actor" at the 2017 Inside Soap Awards. This was praised by the headmistress of Freeman's school, who called the actress "talented, dedicated and hard-working". This was the first award that Freeman had been nominated for, which she found "amazing" and "exciting". The following year, Freeman was shortlisted for Best Young Actor at the 2018 British Soap Awards.

During the 2020 COVID-19 lockdown in the United Kingdom, Freeman and three of her Coronation Street co-stars recreated the four-way phone conversation scene from the 2004 film Mean Girls, which received praise online. Later that year, it was announced that Freeman had departed Coronation Street to explore other acting opportunities, with the role being recast to Harriet Bibby. Freeman said of the news, "I'd like to say thank you to my second family, the cast, crew and viewers who have supported me during my time on the cobbles. After three and a half lovely years I felt it was time for a change and I'm excited to be starting that next chapter with a new role." Bibby said that she found it "lovely" that Freeman wished her good luck in regards to joining the soap. Freeman also revealed on social media that she was set to film something abroad later in 2020. Freeman later commented in 2021 that she found being on the soap "quite limiting" as she was unable to work other projects due to being on a contract.

In October 2021, Freeman portrayed a teenage version of Lin in the sixth episode of its first season of the sitcom Alma's Not Normal. In 2023, Freeman played Leila in the thriller series The Power. In 2024, Freeman portrayed Lilly Wells in the dark comedy-thriller television series Passenger. In 2026, Freeman portrayed Maria in the comedy thriller series How to Get to Heaven from Belfast. She also appeared in the crime drama TV series The Blame as Sophie Madsen.

== Personal life ==
In June 2021, Freeman publicly came out as bisexual on her Instagram story when answering a question about her sexuality. Freeman later thanked her fans for the "love and support" that she had received after revealing her sexuality online, saying, "I really wasn't expecting it and it means the absolute world, you guys are amazing". As of 2021, Freeman lives on a farm. She enjoys surfing, writing, climbing, painting and visiting the zoo. Freeman considers herself a shy person and did not go out to parties before joining Coronation Street.

== Filmography ==
Year	Title	Role	Notes	Ref.
—N/a	The Chime of Youth	—N/a	Short film	
—N/a	Strain	—N/a	Short film	
2016	Lifeline	—N/a	Short film	
2016	Dropperz	Esther	Television pilot	
2017	Doctors	Chantelle Briggs	Guest role	
2017–20	Coronation Street	Summer Spellman	Regular role	
2019	The Last Boy	Lilly	Feature film	
2021	Alma's Not Normal	Teenage Lin Nuthall	1 episode ("Sticking With You")	
2024	Passenger	Lilly Wells	Dark comedy television series	
2026	How to Get to Heaven from Belfast	Maria	Comedy thriller television series	
2026	The Blame	Sophie Madsen	Crime drama television series	

== Awards and nominations ==
List of acting awards and nominations
Year	Award	Category	Title	Result	Ref.
2017	Inside Soap Awards	Best Young Actor	Coronation Street	Shortlisted	
2018	British Soap Awards	Best Young Actor	Coronation Street	Shortlisted	
