= Resident Evil (TV series) =

2022 Netflix television series

- Genre: Action; Horror; Zombie apocalypse
- Based on: Resident Evil by Capcom
- Developed by: Andrew Dabb
- Showrunner: Andrew Dabb
- Starring: Ella Balinska; Tamara Smart; Siena Agudong; Adeline Rudolph; Paola Núñez; Lance Reddick; Ahad Raza Mir
- Composer: Grégory Reveret
- Countries of origin: Germany; United States
- Original language: English
- No. of seasons: 1
- No. of episodes: 8

Production
- Executive producers: Andrew Dabb; Mary Leah Sutton; Oliver Berben; Robert Kulzer; Bronwen Hughes
- Producer: Martin Moszkowicz
- Production location: South Africa
- Camera setup: Single-camera
- Running time: 46–63 minutes
- Production companies: Amalgamated Nonsense; Constantin Television

Original release
- Network: Netflix
- Release: July 14, 2022

Resident Evil is an action horror television series developed by Andrew Dabb for Netflix. Loosely based on the video game series of the same name by Capcom, it is the second television adaptation of the franchise after the animated miniseries Infinite Darkness (2021), and the third live-action adaptation after the film series of the same name and the reboot film Welcome to Raccoon City (2021). The series is set in its own universe, but features the video games' storyline as its backstory and basis.

The series features an ensemble cast led by Lance Reddick as the clones of Albert Wesker, Ella Balinska and Adeline Rudolph as Wesker's children, Tamara Smart and Siena Agudong as the daughters' younger selves, Paola Núñez as James Marcus's daughter Evelyn, and Ahad Raza Mir as Arjun Batra. It alternates between two timelines, following Jade and Billie Wesker during their days in New Raccoon City where they discover their father's and Umbrella Corporation's dark secrets, and 14 years in the future, where Jade tries to survive the end of the world.

In 2019, Netflix began development with Constantin Film, the rightsholders who have previously produced the film series, as the production company involved. The series was formally announced in 2020, having been greenlit as an eight-episode series with each episode one hour in length. Dabb was hired as showrunner alongside a number of other Netflix projects. Due to the COVID-19 pandemic, production was delayed eight months and took place from February to July 2021. Resident Evil premiered on July 14, 2022, to generally mixed reviews from critics. In August 2022, the series was canceled after one season.

== Plot ==
After Raccoon City was destroyed by a retroviral bio-weapon called the T-virus in 1998, the Umbrella Corporation faced public scandal and a significant drop in stock prices. By 2003/2004, their federalisation and liquidation were upheld by the courts and found liable for victim compensation. Umbrella Corporation itself declared bankruptcy soon after, but was able to recover under the guidance of its CEO Evelyn Marcus, daughter of the late Umbrella co-founder James Marcus, in the hopes of regaining trust and the truth surrounding the Raccoon City incident was buried. Former Umbrella executive Albert Wesker conspired to trigger an extinction event with the help of his clones Al, Alby and Bert. Wesker was killed in 2009 and the clones went into the custody of Umbrella.

The series' main plot is spread out between two points in time – 2022 and 2036, with a gap of 14 years. The past plotline deals with the struggles of 14-year-old fraternal twins Billie and Jade, the children of Al Wesker, conceived through a genetic engineering project. Their lives take a dramatic turn when Al is awarded an executive position at the struggling Umbrella Corporation that once employed him, and they move to Umbrella's planned community, New Raccoon City in South Africa. While there the two girls stumble onto the dark secrets behind their origins and Umbrella's dark legacy, their father coordinates a response to the outbreak of the T-virus, which spreads to the rest of the world, marking a societal collapse known as "The Fall".

In the present of 2036, the T-virus has reduced human civilization to 300 million refugees living in walled city-states and other settlements, surrounded by the six billion man-eating humans known as Zeroes who contracted the disease. The most powerful organization left on Earth is the Umbrella Corporation, backed by its military arsenal, who are conducting a global manhunt for Jade.

== Cast and characters ==
=== Main ===
- Ella Balinska as Jade Wesker
  - Tamara Smart as young Jade Wesker
- Adeline Rudolph as Billie Wesker
  - Siena Agudong as young Billie Wesker
- Paola Núñez as Evelyn Marcus, James Marcus's daughter and CEO of the Umbrella Corporation
- Lance Reddick as:
  - Dr. Albert "Al" Wesker, Jade and Billie's father
  - Bert Wesker, Jade and Billie's uncle and Al's brother
  - Alby Wesker, Al and Bert's deceased brother
  - Albert Wesker, a rogue Umbrella operative who created several clones of himself

=== Recurring ===
- Turlough Convery as Richard Baxter, an Umbrella soldier
- Connor Gosatti as Simon Marcus, Evelyn's son
- Ahad Raza Mir as Arjun Batra, Jade's partner
- Ella Zieglmeier as Bea, Jade's daughter
- Pedro de Tavira Egurrola as Angel Rubio, a reporter

In addition, Candice van Litsenborgh co-stars as Mother Zero, Anthony Oseyemi co-stars as Roth, Lea Vivier co-stars as Susana Franco, Casey B. Dolan co-stars as Lisa Trevor, and Marisa Drummond co-stars as a guard.

== Episodes ==
No.	Title	Directed by	Written by	Original release date
1	"Welcome to New Raccoon City"	Bronwen Hughes	Andrew Dabb	July 14, 2022
2022: Jade Wesker, her "twin" sister Billie Wesker and their father, Albert Wesker, arrive in New Raccoon City, a planned community in South Africa, where Albert's work is vital to the Umbrella Corporation. Billie sees animals being transported in her father's automated building, despite Umbrella disavowing any link to animal testing. She and Jade gain entry to document the animals and inadvertently release Cerberus, an undead mutant doberman. The dog chases them and bites Billie's neck before Jade kills it with a fire extinguisher. 2036: In London, Jade researches Pack #2426, a group of mutant humans known as "zeroes". All goes well until a gigantic mutant caterpillar attacks and knocks her unconscious. She is saved by apparent Good Samaritans and taken to a fortified refuge to receive medical treatment. Her saviours plan to hand her over to Umbrella, as she is considered a high-value target. Umbrella arrives, and the leader, Baxter, orders his soldiers to execute everyone but Jade, who must be captured alive. Carnage ensues, and Jade escapes by leaping into the massed horde of zeroes encircling the refuge.
2	"The Devil You Know"	Bronwen Hughes	Mary Leah Sutton	July 14, 2022
2022: Jade and Billie are found by Albert, who helps them flee before Umbrella's U.S.S. operators appear. At home, he tells the girls the dog was being treated for a "rare genetic disease". He tells them it is a classified government project and makes them promise to never talk about it. In the morning, Jade continues to investigate and finds a website claiming to have "The Truth". It discusses outbreaks at Umbrella's labs that cause infected employees to become cannibals. The website's admin, Angel Rubio, is an investigative reporter obsessed with Umbrella. Meanwhile, Billie vomits and starts to show signs of infection. 2036: Jade is forced to fend for herself against the Zero horde. Baxter orders his men to focus on killing the Zeroes to protect her so she can be captured. Jade manages to escape and drives to Dover. She is among some refugees when a ferry arrives, and the group are confronted by a U.S.S. convoy backed up by an armed drone. The crowd is forced to run, with the drone firing on and killing them, as Baxter looks on from his stationary vehicle.
3	"The Light"	Rob Seidenglanz	Shane Frank & Garett Pereda	July 14, 2022
2022: In the morning, Billie gets up disoriented but pretends to be fine. At school, she becomes distressed and hypersensitive to sound. She also starts having hallucinations. Jade talks to fellow student Simon about getting more notes from Angel after class, but an unexpected update to Umbrella's firewall means that cannot happen until he learns the code. 2036: Jade joins a refugee convoy. During the drive, the refugees hear Lickers nearby and are forced to hide in their cars. Baxter arrives, alerting the Lickers who break into the convoy and start killing people. Only a few escape, and, while travelling through flooded tunnels, they discover that a boy, Liam, is infected. He had been bitten three days before and his parents had not told anybody. Suddenly, a giant mutated spider starts attacking. In the ensuing fight, Liam's father dies before Jade finally kills the spider. She urges Liam's mother to leave the boy, but she refuses. Continuing her journey alone, Jade exits the tunnel in Calais, France, and finds Baxter waiting for her. Brotherhood militants appear and start shooting. They capture Jade, Baxter and other survivors.
4	"The Turn"	Rob Seidenglanz	Kerry Williamson	July 14, 2022
2022: Billie convinces Jade to go with her to a party at Simon's house. Angel infiltrates New Raccoon City. He tracks the pair to the party and warns them they are in danger. They talk about the Raccoon City incident, believed to be the result of a gas leak or a fire. Angel insists it was a nuclear attack planned by the US government as a cover-up. According to records, the two girls do not exist and Albert died in 2009. His comments scare the girls, and they flee. Trying to catch up with them, he is detained by Umbrella security. 2036: The Brotherhood takes their new captives to a prison. Jade becomes intrigued by a group of chained-up Zeroes, which provides a workforce to move a large mechanism and power the prison. One of them, "Mother Zero", seems to be their leader. Baxter persuades Jade to help him escape. They succeed and rally other captured USS troopers, when the Zeroes are let loose. In the ensuing fight, Jade decapitates the queen and escapes the prison. Baxter dies before making it out.
5	"Home Movies"	Rachel Goldberg	Lindsey Villarreal	July 14, 2022
2022: Albert is picked up and taken to Umbrella HQ to meet with Evelyn. He is introduced to a badly-beaten Angel Rubio and ordered to interrogate him. Solving riddles around Wesker's house, Jade finds a hidden bag containing US$10,000, fake US passports and a gun. The girls and Simon find a secret laboratory in the house and trigger an intruder alarm. The research data is set on fire. Albert enters, angry and confused. He reveals the girls were born in the UCSF School of Medicine in San Francisco, using two women's eggs. The dog that bit Billie was infected with T-virus, which causes mutations; she is resistant to the virus, as the girls were genetically modified to excel in mental and physical performances. Umbrella is aware of their origins, and will preserve Billie as a lab specimen if they find out she was infected. 2036: Jade is captured by a USS unit. The commander watches on as Jade is restrained, then removes her helmet: she is Billie.
6	"Someone's Little Girl"	Batan Silva	Jeff Howard	July 14, 2022
2022: While interrogating Angel, Albert secretly asks if anyone else knows about Billie and Jade. Angel says "no", and is injected with a drug that kills him. Evelyn cancels the interrogation while medical personnel examine Angel; she accuses Albert of being Angel's mole and has him imprisoned. In the adjacent cell, Albert finds an exact double of himself with a beard. During Angel's autopsy, an incision causes his body to begin convulsing. 2036: Jade is locked up in an Umbrella base. Billie, who is working for Evelyn, interrogates Jade. The two last saw each other in 2026, when Jade was pregnant. Albert has since died. While Jade knows Umbrella is a threat to the University, Billie's search for Jade is more personal—although resistant to the T-Virus, she is not immune, and will eventually deteriorate. Billie mentions a University search team's position before removing an Umbrella tracking chip from Jade's arm. Jade collects Mother Zero's severed head and flees. At the coast, she finds a boat, but is ambushed by the search team, consisting of Amrita and Gideon. They take her to their ship, carrying Arjun and Bea. Mother Zero's body is autopsied. Amrita, who is two months pregnant, takes part. The autopsy reveals that Mother Zero's body is producing two enzymes which degrade when exposed to oxygen. They undertake several tests, trying to preserve the enzymes with artificial saliva. Jade stabilizes Test 56 by spitting in the sample. Introducing T-virus to the enzymes, they determine that one attracts the virus and the other repels it. The enzymes could be used to ward Zeroes away or have them attack a target. To put the theory to the test, Jade rides out in a boat to retrieve a Zero woman. Bea walks into the lab, but Jade stops her at the door. Jade cuts her own finger to begin the test, expecting to trigger the Zero's sense of smell. Her enzyme treatment works and keeps her protected, but the Zero turns her attention to Bea and chases her down the corridor. Bea inadvertently leads the Zero to the others; Amrita is bitten before the Zero is gunned down.
7	"Parasite"	Batan Silva	Mary Leah Sutton	July 14, 2022
2005: Albert "Al" Wesker, Albert "Bert" Wesker and Albert "Alby" Wesker perform research at an Umbrella outpost. The three are clones of Albert Wesker, their superhuman leader. USS operators attempt to detain them for their unauthorized use of Umbrella assets. Albert decides to kill the clones to prevent their being used. However, he only manages to kill Alby before escaping. Al and Bert are captured as Umbrella CEO Evelyn Marcus reaches the lab. 2022: Al and Bert talk through the wall, not having seen one another in 17 years. Evelyn interrogates Al, saying that the autopsy revealed that Angel was poisoned with a lethal dose of Umbrella's new product Joy: confirming her suspicions that he sabotaged the interrogation. Meanwhile, Bert kills two Umbrella guards and escapes. At school, Billie and Jade are talking with Simon when Bert arrives, in a stolen car, to pick them up. Bert reveals that he and Al are clones and part of an R&D team. The Umbrella team tracks them down. Bert uses his fighting prowess to kill three guards, but Roth manages to restrain him. Billie and Jade are brought to the interrogation room, where Al lies on the floor in pain. Blood samples are taken from the girls, and Evelyn reveals the truth about their origins. They were created to treat Al's condition, and are a permanent source of viable blood for transfusions. Offered a blood sample, Al injects himself and recovers. Billie and Jade are allowed to leave. 2036: Jade discovers an Umbrella tracking device embedded in Mother Zero's head; Mother Zero had been a person of interest when the Brotherhood captured her, and Jade is responsible for Umbrella finding the ship. Meanwhile, the crew agrees to discuss a truce: Saquim is to go ashore and meet with Evelyn Marcus. He is taken to a tent at a temporary base and introduced to Evelyn, who wants Jade handed over. When Bea comes to visit, Jade warns her to take Arjun and a green duffel bag and leave the ship. Soon, the others return to report the deal with Evelyn and prepare to surrender her. Onshore, USS commander Molloy directs Jade to the base. There, she finds Evelyn, who begins singing and dancing: Evelyn is revealed to be under Billie's control. Billie is using the modified Joy to manipulate her and, unofficially, has been in control of Umbrella for years. She plans to keep Jade as a source of blood to stabilize her condition. Realizing that she cannot stop the order, Jade releases a vial containing the attractor enzyme; hundreds of Zeroes begin flocking to the base, killing USS operators. The ship is put on alert and the crew disembark, revealing that a massive infected is crocodile in tow. The Zeroes break through the base's perimeter wall and rush towards Billie and Jade, who reach out and hold hands.
8	"Revelations"	Rachel Goldberg	Tara Knight & Andrew Dabb	July 14, 2022
2022: Evelyn brings Bert back to his cell. She offers him his own house in exchange for help with a new project, the Tyrant. Jade and Billie try to escape, but Roth catches Billie. Simon and Jade infiltrate Umbrella HQ. Upstairs, Billie regains control of herself, stabbing a labtech in the eye with the syringe and slashes Evelyn. Bert asks her about Al. Roth is put in charge of a USS team hunting Billie with orders to kill. Evelyn joins them as they expand their search. Hallucinating again and, believing herself under attack, Billie bites Simon, infecting him with T-virus. He abandons the group and surrenders to Evelyn, who executes him. The two Wesker men kill several operators and drag Billie and Jade out of the building, and the four flee. Al and Bert begin soaking the lab with chemicals to make a bomb. Al tells Bert to go with the girls while he sets it off. He tears of a piece of paper and writes a contact for Jade (latter revealed to be Ada Wong). The three leave, and Al is confronted by Evelyn. She shoots him twice; he falls and flicks the lighter on. The lab catches fire, but Evelyn makes it to safety. The escaped Tyrant breaks through the rubble of the lab. 2036: The Zeroes make their way through Umbrella's perimeter. Billie returns to the tent where Evelyn is, while Jade is dragged out by two operators towards the Zeroes and fights back. Billie activates Umbrella's drones, which begin to wipe out the Zeroes as Jade escapes. Still covered in the deterrent enzyme, Jade is ignored by the Zeroes and heads to the ship, where Arjun helps her climb aboard. As emergency protection, should Umbrella succeed, Saqim orders the release of the mutant crocodile. Billie's drones finish exterminating the Zeroes; the remaining USS operators die in the cross-fire. On the ship, Jade realises that Bea is missing and has gone ashore on a stolen boat. Billie escapes on a helicopter, using its rockets to kill the crocodile. Jade is confronted by Billie and the helicopter crew, wanting to take Bea back as a specimen. Unable to shoot her sister, Jade offers to surrender in exchange for her daughter Bea's freedom. Billie instead shoots Jade, deeming her an irrelevance if she has Bea. Jade gets back up right as the helicopter flies over.

== Production ==
=== Development ===
In January 2019, it was announced that Netflix was in development of a series based upon the Resident Evil franchise. No major updates were given, until August 2020 when it was revealed that the series had been picked up for 8 one hour episodes. It was also revealed that Andrew Dabb would write the series, in addition to him serving as an executive producer and showrunner. Bronwen Hughes was also executive producer and directed the first two episodes.

Production was originally set to take place from June to October 2020, to be handled by Moonlighting Films, which previously worked on Resident Evil: The Final Chapter. Due to the COVID-19 pandemic, however, these plans were shelved for the rest of the year. Over 2020 the series went through retooling, with the promotion of Jeffrey Howard as co-Executive Producer in place of Dabb who was busy overseeing Grendel. Production resumed on February 19, 2021, with principal photography split into four production blocks and concluding on July 9.

Alongside Ada Wong, who was teased in the final episode, Andrew Dabb confirmed characters from the games such as Jill Valentine, Claire Redfield and Lady Dimitrescu were to appear in a potential second season, and suggested Eva Green for the latter role.

On August 26, 2022, Netflix canceled the series after one season.

=== Casting ===
Casting took place in November 2020, with casting directors working in the United Kingdom, United States for the principal cast, and South Africa for the supporting cast and extras. American actor Lance Reddick was cast in the role of Albert Wesker. The role of Billie Wesker was given to American actresses Siena Agudong and Adeline Rudolph, with British actresses Tamara Smart and Ella Balinska cast as her sister Jade. Paola Núñez was cast in the role of Wesker's assistant, Carol. Pakistani actor Ahad Raza Mir joined the cast for the role of Arjun Batra.

=== Filming ===
Principal photography took place from February to July 2021. Internal scenes were filmed on a soundstage at Cape Town Film Studios, while dilapidated local buildings such as the Werdmuller Centre and the Maitland Abattoir were used for location filming. Production was divided into four production blocks, with directors Bronwen Hughes, Rob Seidenglanz, Batán Silva and Rachel Goldberg each responsible for two episodes each. As part of block 3, scenes were filmed aboard the Sarah Baartman and S.A. Agulhas, with the help of Frog Squad, a company specialising in underwater filming.

== Marketing ==
While Netflix maintained a press embargo on the series before and during principal photography, a synopsis for an early series pitch was accidentally published and then deleted. Similarly, an early copy of the first episode's script was published on the Internet Archive before being taken down in a copyright complaint. The series was officially announced in August 2020, with Andrew Dabb posting the front page of the completed "Welcome to New Raccoon City" script, with the principal cast being announced near the end of filming in June 2021.

Marketing for the series proper began on November 30, 2021, with the opening of an official Instagram page for the series, which posted an image of a mutant dog which was set to appear. Two trailers were released online on May 11, 2022, with the first two episodes aired at a private press screening. In attendance, Dabb described the original universe of the show as featuring the video games as their backstory and basis.

== Release ==
The series was released on July 14, 2022, on Netflix.

== Reception ==
=== Critical reception ===
The review aggregator website Rotten Tomatoes reported a 54% approval rating based on 52 critic reviews, with an average rating of 5.8/10. The website's critics consensus reads, "While Resident Evil comes closer than previous adaptations to honoring the beloved video games' labyrinthine lore, this zombie serial could still use more brains." On Metacritic, the first season has a score of 53 out of 100, based on 16 critics, indicating "mixed or average reviews". The audience and fan reaction to the show was overwhelmingly negative.

=== Audience viewership ===
According to Samba TV, 988,000 US households watched the premiere of the series during its first four days streaming on Netflix. The series premiere over-indexed most with Black and Hispanic viewers by +29% and +27% respectively. It debuted second, behind Stranger Things (season 4), then dethroned it days later. From July 11 to July 17, the show was the second most streamed on Netflix globally, and was within the top 10 in over 92 countries.
