= A Babysitter's Guide to Monster Hunting =

American comedy horror film

- Official release poster
- Directed by: Rachel Talalay
- Screenplay by: Joe Ballarini
- Based on: A Babysitter's Guide to Monster Hunting by Joe Ballarini
- Produced by: Ivan Reitman; Amie Karp
- Starring: Tamara Smart; Oona Laurence; Ian Ho; Troy Leigh-Anne Johnson; Lynn Masako Cheng; Ty Consiglio; Tom Felton
- Cinematography: Gregory Middleton
- Edited by: Stein Myhrstad
- Music by: Matthew Margeson
- Production companies: The Montecito Picture Company; Walden Media
- Distributed by: Netflix
- Release date: October 15, 2020
- Running time: 94 minutes
- Country: United States
- Language: English

A Babysitter's Guide to Monster Hunting is a 2020 American dark fantasy comedy horror film directed by Rachel Talalay and distributed by Netflix. The film was written by Joe Ballarini and is based on his book trilogy of the same name. It stars Tom Felton, Indya Moore, Tamara Smart and Oona Laurence.

== Plot ==
Rhode Island teenager Kelly Ferguson is cruelly nicknamed "Monster Girl" as a high school freshman because a monster had attacked her when she was young. Although planning to attend a senior's Halloween party that night, Kelly's mom has told her boss Ms. Zellman that Kelly can babysit her son Jacob so she can attend their office party. She gives her pages of information, of do's and don'ts. Once they're alone, Jacob tells Kelly about the monsters that plague him, showing her drawings of them.

Kelly tells him that he'll stop dreaming of them in the future, like she did, then she checks for monsters under the bed and in the closet before handing him a little light to ward off dark things. A few minutes later she hurries back, only to find three small monsters abducting him. After an unsuccessful 911 call, Kelly meets Liz Lerue, who is part of a secret society of children-protecting babysitters, and she calls the small monsters who carried off Jacob "Toadies". They go on a mission to find Jacob, who has been kidnapped by the Boogeyman.

Liz uses the infant she cares for to lure out the Toadies, after tracking them down. However, the shiny object she offers it for Jacob doesn't tempt it as it normally would. The Toadies deliver Jacob to the Boogeyman, who gleefully explains how he plans to collect an army of monsters, thanks to Jacob's ability to imagine a large variety of them. He sets up Jacob in a bed, hooks his head in a helmet designed to extract his nightmares, and tries to lull him to sleep. Meanwhile, after Liz returns the baby to her home, the girls go to Brown University to the Rhode Island Order of Babysitters headquarters. As the vice president, she tasks the trainees (SITs) with emptying the pouch of the Toadie they've captured and searching for Jacob.

Using a magic dust to recover memory, Kelly recalls the Boogeyman telling her at five that she has the ability to bring her dreams to life. She realizes he's the Grand Guignol, a stealer of dreams and bringer of nightmares. All of the SITs share scars from their own run-ins with boogeymen as small children. They will have to imbed Angel Hair potion in the Boogeyman with a monster punch. Curtis searches the globe for the ingredients. In the meantime, he provides Kelly with a few tools to help her on their quest. Feeding the Toadie a tracker, they let it escape in hopes it will lead them to the Boogeyman.

The Toadie finds the tracker and informs the Boogeyman, who sets up a trap. Led to the Halloween party Kelly had wanted to attend, Liz and an unenthusiastic Kelly enter, seeking the tracker. A shadow monster awaits them in the basement. Chasing it around the house, they eventually realize they were led to a dead end. Next, the girls try to prevent a cat's eye amulet from being used by the Boogeyman, but are unsuccessful. Kelly escapes, but he captures Liz. Simultaneously both Curtis is concocting the Angel Hair potion while Kelly finds and breaks into the condemned lighthouse where Jacob is being held and the nightmares are starting to be extracted.

The Toadies try to cage Kelly, but she outwits them. A hypnotised Liz locks her up, but she uses a multi-functional tool from Curtis which knocks her down and snaps her back to normal. In the chamber where the nightmare creatures are about to be released by the Boogeyman, Kelly knocks the Angel Hair given to her by a SIT into him with a monster punch and an awakened Jacob dissipates the nightmare monsters.

Getting Jacob home before Ms. Zellman arrives, Kelly is commended for getting Jacob to sleep. Not only is she asked to babysit the next night, but Liz tells her she's going to recommend her to the Order of Babysitters and her crush Victor asks her out.

== Cast ==
- Tamara Smart as Kelly Ferguson
  - Isabel Birch as Young Kelly
- Oona Laurence as Liz LeRue
- Alessio Scalzotto as Victor Colletti
- Indya Moore as Peggy Drood
- Tom Felton as Grand Guignol/Boogeyman
- Ian Ho as Jacob Zellman
- Tamsen McDonough as Ms. Zellman
- Troy Leigh-Anne Johnson as Berna Vincent
- Lynn Masako Cheng as Cassie Zhen
- Ty Consiglio as Curtis Critter
- Ashton Arbab as Tommy
- Crystal Balint as Alexa Ferguson
- Ricky He as Jesper Huang
- Anisa Harris as Deanna
- Cameron Bancroft as Pete Ferguson
- Kelcey Mawema as Veronica Preston
- Mithila Palkar as Babysitter from Mumbai (India)
- Momona Tamada as Babysitter from Japan

== Release ==
The film premiered on Netflix on October 15, 2020.

== Reception ==
On review aggregator Rotten Tomatoes, the film has an approval rating of 65% based on 20 critic reviews, with an average rating of 6/10. On Metacritic, it has a weighted average score of 31 out of 100 based on 4 critic reviews, indicating "generally unfavorable" reviews.

== See also ==
- List of films set around Halloween
