= Just Act Normal =

British comedy drama television series

- Genre: Comedy drama
- Based on: Little Birds by Janice Okoh
- Screenplay by: Janice Okoh
- Directed by: Nathaniel Martello-White
- Starring: Chenée Taylor; Kaydrah Walker-Wilkie; Akins Subair; Romola Garai; Sam Buchanan
- Country of origin: United Kingdom
- Original language: English
- No. of series: 1
- No. of episodes: 6

Production
- Cinematography: Adam Barnett
- Production company: The Forge

Original release
- Network: BBC Three
- Release: 16 April – 30 April 2025

Just Act Normal is a 2025 British comedy drama television series adapted by Janice Okoh from her stage play Three Birds. It stars Chenée Taylor, Kaydrah Walker-Wilkie, Akins Subair, Romola Garai, and Sam Buchanan. The series premiered on 16 April 2025 on BBC Three.

== Premise ==
Three siblings must cope with life when their mother Jackie disappears.

== Cast and characters ==
- Chenée Taylor as Tiana
- Kaydrah Walker-Wilkie as Tanika
- Akins Subair as Tionne
- Romola Garai as Ms Jenkins
- Sam Buchanan as Dr Feelgood
- Jamelia as Fake Jackie
- Ivanno Jeremiah as Leo
- Jennifer Metcalfe as Candy
- Talitha Wing as Rome
- Lauren Beardsmore as Lisa

== Production ==
The series is adapted by Janice Okoh from her own stage play Three Birds, which original 2013 production had Michaela Coel and Susan Wokoma. The setting has been moved from South London to Birmingham. The series is directed by Nathaniel Martello-White. The series is from producers The Forge Entertainment, as was originally titled as We Go Again.

The six-part series is the first television roles for the three lead actors: Chenée Taylor (who plays Tiana), Kaydrah Walker-Wilkie (Tanika) and Akins Subair (Tionne), but also includes Romola Garai, Sam Buchanan, Talitha Wing, Ivanno Jeremiah and Jamelia, with a guest role for Jennifer Metcalfe.

Filming took place in Birmingham and Coventry in June 2024.

== Broadcast ==
Just Act Normal premiered on 16 April 2025 on BBC Three.

== Reception ==
=== Critical response ===
The series has received positive reviews and praise from critics. In a 5-star review for The Guardian, Lucy Mangan summarized it as "heartbreaking, hugely funny, endlessly subtle ... incredible TV", and described the "youthful cast" as "exceptional". Writing for RadioTimes.com, Morgan Cormack said "levity, comedy and charm [were all] delivered flawlessly through [the] three newcomer leads."

Walker-Wilkie was nominated for the Breakthrough Award at the 2026 Royal Television Society Programme Awards.
