= Passenger (2024 British TV series) =

2024 British comedy-thriller television series

- Genre: Comedy-thriller
- Created by: Andrew Buchan
- Written by: Andrew Buchan
- Directed by: Lee Haven-Jones; Nicole Charles
- Country of origin: United Kingdom
- Original language: English
- No. of seasons: 1
- No. of episodes: 6

Production
- Executive producers: Jane Featherstone; Lucy Dyke; Simon Maloney
- Producer: Sumrah Mohammed
- Running time: 48 minutes
- Production companies: Sister; Northern Sister

Original release
- Network: ITV
- Release: 24 March 2024

Passenger is a British dark comedy-thriller television series created by Andrew Buchan in his screenwriting debut. It premiered on ITV1 and ITVX in the United Kingdom before airing on ITV on 24 March 2024.

Set in the fictional northern village of Chadder Vale, the series follows Riya Ajunwa, a former Metropolitan Police officer who relocates from Manchester to care for her mother-in-law, and becomes entangled in a local investigation that exposes tensions within the tight-knit community. The series stars Wunmi Mosaku and David Threlfall in the lead roles, with a supporting cast including Daniel Ryan, Jo Hartley, Barry Sloane, Natalie Gavin, and Nico Mirallegro.

Commissioned by ITV and BritBox International in March 2022, the six-episode series was produced by Sister and Northern Sister, with Jane Featherstone and Lucy Dyke serving as executive producers. Principal photography took place in the West Yorkshire village of Cornholme. The show was not renewed for a second season.

== Cast ==
- Wunmi Mosaku as Riya Ajunwa, a former Met officer who moved from Manchester to Chadder Vale to look after her mother-in-law
- David Threlfall as Jim Bracknell, a traumatised fracking site manager
- Daniel Ryan as Derek Jackson, local bread factory owner and divorcee
- Jo Hartley as CC Linda Markel, head of the local police station
- Rowan Robinson as Katie Wells, an accountant at the bread factory
- Barry Sloane as Eddie Wells, Katie's father who was recently released early from a five-year prison sentence for attacking Jim
- Natalie Gavin as Joanne Wells, Katie's mother and Eddie's wife who works multiple jobs to make ends meet
- Hubert Hanowicz as Jakub Makowski, local garage mechanic from Gdańsk, Poland who bonds with Riya
- Arian Nik as Nish Chowdry, an unambitious trainee officer
- Nico Mirallegro as Kane Jackson, Derek's half-brother who helps out at the factory despite their uneasy relationship
- Ella Bruccoleri as Alison Day, a trainee officer and vegan environmentalist
- Jack James Ryan as John Trowbridge, a factory worker and Katie's boyfriend with a drinking problem
- Matilda Freeman as Lilly Wells, Katie's younger sister
- Shervin Alenabi as Mehmet Shah, Katie's friend who works at his mother's fish and chip shop and makes John jealous
- Lisa Allen as Jill, the local pharmacist
- Ray Castleton as Cabbie Geoff

== Production ==
In March 2022, it was announced ITV and BritBox International had commissioned a six-part series titled Passengers from actor Andrew Buchan in his screenwriting debut. Jane Featherstone and Lucy Dyke would executive produce the series for Sister with Simon Maloney. Sumrah Mohammed served as producer, while Lee Haven-Jones and Nicole Charles directed the series.

It was announced in February 2023 that Wunmi Mosaku would lead the series alongside David Threlfall. Also joining the cast were Daniel Ryan, Rowan Robinson, Barry Sloane as Eddie Wells, Natalie Gavin, Nico Mirallegro, Hubert Hanowicz, and Jack James Ryan as well as Matilda Freeman, Shervin Alenabi, and Arian Nik.

Principal photography was underway in the West Yorkshire village of Cornholme as of February 2023.

The show was not renewed for a second season.
