= Werdmuller Centre =

Former shopping centre in Cape Town

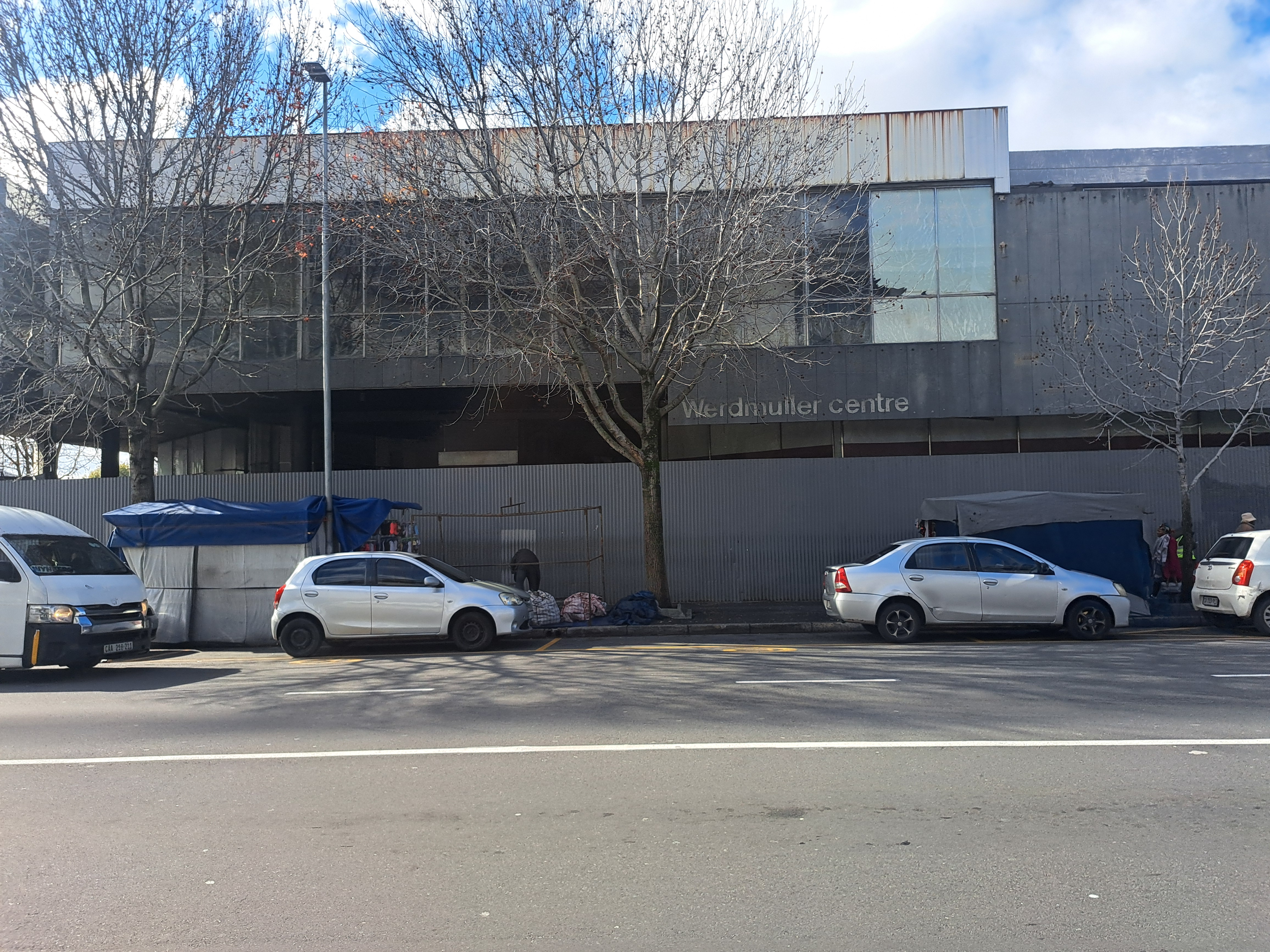
- The Werdmuller Centre in July 2025
- Interactive map of the Werdmuller Centre area

General information
- Architectural style: Brutalist
- Location: 189 Main Road, Claremont, Cape Town
- Coordinates: 33°58′53″S 18°27′57″E
- Opening: 1975
- Closed: 2012
- Owner: New Property Ventures

Design and construction
- Architect: Roelof Uytenbogaardt
- Developer: South African Life Assurance Society (later Old Mutual)

Other information
- Number of stores: 49 originally
- Number of anchors: None

The Werdmuller Centre was a mixed-use shopping centre and notable modernist building located in Claremont, Cape Town, South Africa. Named after former Old Mutual chairman George Werdmuller, the centre was designed in a brutalist architectural style by Cape Town-based architect Roelof Uytenbogaardt in 1969. It began construction in 1970 and was completed around 1975.

The centre struggled commercially for years, and the then-owners of the building, Old Mutual Properties, applied for a demolition permit in 2006. The proposed demolition received opposition from the architectural and heritage communities. The centre's final tenant vacated in 2012, and the centre subsequently closed.

The building was sold to New Property Ventures by the mid-2010s, and the company has proposed redeveloping it. The building was used as a set for the film The Dark Tower in 2016 and for the Resident Evil television series in 2021. A redevelopment proposal was approved in 2023; the building will be partially demolished and become a mixed-use development named the Neo.

== History ==
=== Design and construction ===
In 1969, Cape Town-based architect Roelof Uytenbogaardt submitted a design proposal to the South African Life Assurance Society, now known as Old Mutual, for a shopping complex next to the Main Road in Claremont, a suburb of Cape Town. The building was named after the former chairman of Old Mutual, George Werdmuller. Construction began in 1970. The development intended to revitalise the east side of the Main Road, which was at risk of experiencing urban blight.

Uytenbogaardt sought to design a building that would be an alternative to the mainstream North American model of an enclosed shopping mall accessed by car with a parking area outside. The centre was designed to be an externalised building with views of Table Mountain and to incorporate pedestrian traffic from the Main Road and the nearby Claremont railway station into the building. The building's interior ramp was designed to lead visitors up to a terrace on the roof, where they could see the mountain.

Uytenbogaardt wrote in his proposal that the development would be "a hinterland of a well mixed community ranging from high income through to middle and low." The centre was designed to have smaller trading spaces in line with a micro-market retail concept catering to non-white traders, who could not trade freely due to apartheid restrictions in Cape Town.

Shortly after the design proposal was submitted and approved, the South African government utilised the Group Areas Act to declare Claremont a "whites only" area in November 1969, resulting in the forced relocation of 19,000 non-white residents from Lower Claremont (now known as Harfield Village) beginning in early 1970. When the centre's construction was completed in 1975, the clientele that the centre was designed to cater for no longer existed, and there was a decrease in pedestrians visiting Claremont brought on by the designation of the suburb as a "whites only" area.

=== Retail operations ===
The Werdmuller Centre opened in 1975 and received favourable coverage in local media. However, the centre was not commercially successful. Along with the lack of intended traders and clientele due to forced removal of non-white residents in the area, the centre had to compete with Cavendish Square, a conventional shopping mall located across from the building; Cavendish was also developed by Old Mutual.

After construction, the smaller retail spaces were adjusted to resemble conventional, larger shops. Over the years, the retail spaces in the centre were continuously altered to attract suitable tenants; however, these attempts were unsuccessful. The building did not have a large area for parking cars. The building also leaked in the rain.

The centre contained 49 shops during its operational years and never had traditional anchor tenants. Furniture chain Beares had a store in the centre. However, it closed, and the retail space it occupied was later rented by a church. Other tenants included David Philip Publishers and Paul Bothner Music.

=== Closure and proposed redevelopment ===
In 2006, the building's owner, Old Mutual Properties, applied for a demolition permit, which was met with opposition from the local architectural community as well as the heritage community. A Heritage Impact Assessment conducted in December 2007 specified that the reason that the owners wanted to demolish it was because it had become a financial liability. The centre's final tenant vacated the centre in 2012, and the centre subsequently closed and boarded its entrances. Old Mutual Properties started conducting another impact assessment in 2012 as a potential step toward demolition. By January 2014, the Werdmuller had been acquired by New Property Ventures, which sought to demolish the building. Opponents to demolition have included the South African Working Party of Docomomo International, affiliated with the South African Institute of Architects.

The derelict shopping centre was leased as a film set for The Dark Tower in 2016 as well as for the Resident Evil television series in 2021. In The Dark Tower, the building is styled as a place where demonic creatures gather. Part of an episode of the BBC television series Noughts + Crosses (2020) was filmed in the centre to provide a dystopian atmosphere.

In November 2023, the Claremont Improvement District Company announced that a partial demolition of the building had been approved by Heritage Western Cape. The announcement specified that the building was to undergo redevelopment to become a mixed-used development named the "The Neo", which would have a gross leasable area of 30,000 square metres. It was the first high-rise building development, standing at 64 metres, to be approved for construction in Claremont. Construction was set to begin in 2024. In the Claremont Improvement District Company's "State of Claremont" Report for 2025/2026, the redevelopment is listed as planned. According to the report, the design has been finalised and the redeveloped building will have a height of 62 metres, making it the tallest building approved by the Cape Town City Council for construction in Claremont. The building's gross leasable area has been revised down to 8,000 square metres, and the development has an estimated value of R800 million.

== Architecture and design ==
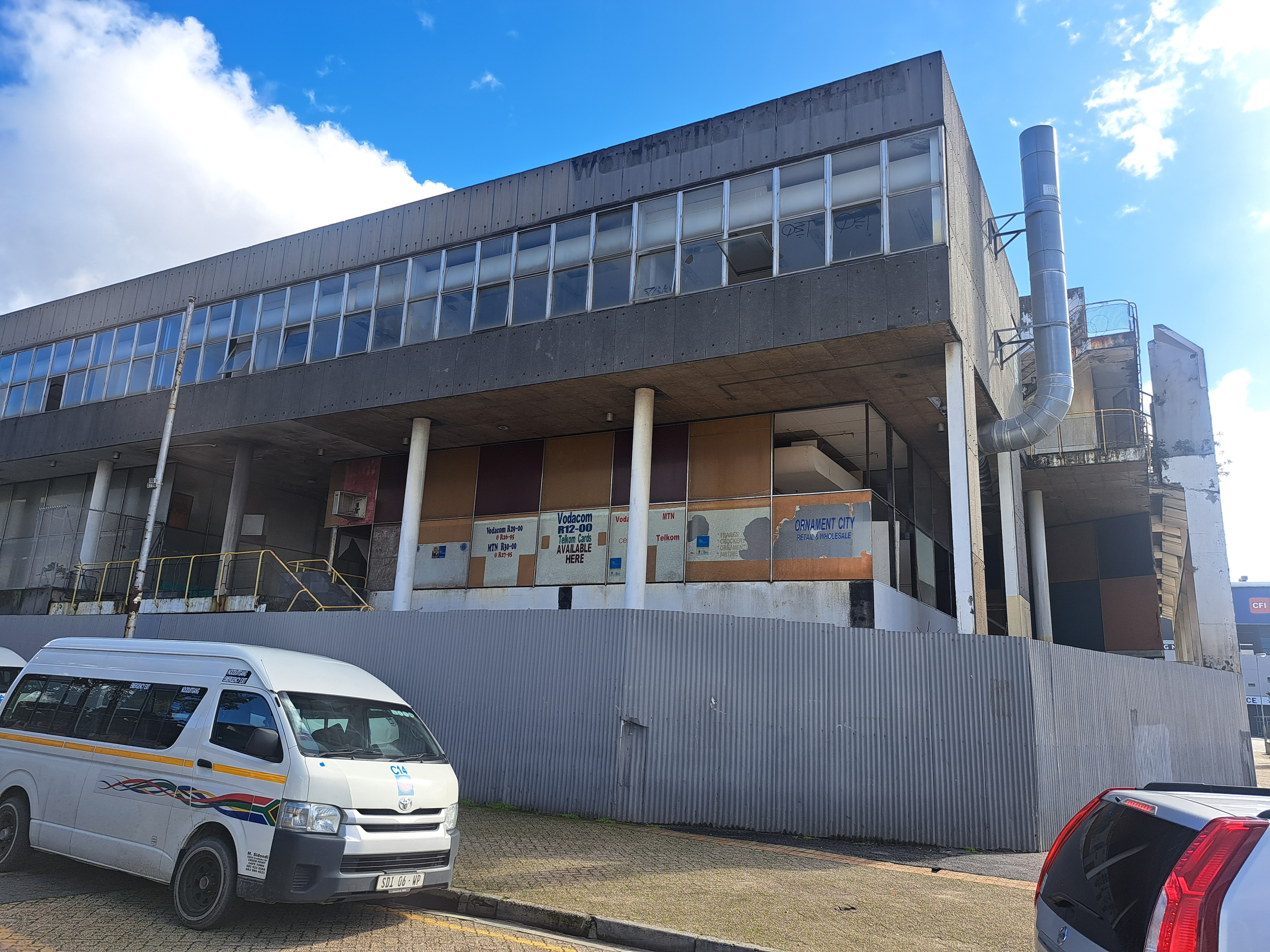
The Werdmuller Centre in July 2025

The Werdmuller Centre is an example of a South African building in the brutalist architecture style. It was inspired by French-Swiss architect Le Corbusier. A design magazine described the building as having the typical characteristics of brutalism, with "audacious structures of raw concrete set out in monolithic geometric forms of rigid angles and, at times, massive volumetric curves."

The interior of the centre was designed in line with a souk concept on account that resources could be easily shared between non-white traders. However, the designation of Claremont as a "whites only" area in November 1969 meant that the micro-market concept could no longer come to fruition.

The centre's design received praise in the local media after its opening, with John Benzon writing in the Cape Times that the building was the "best thing that has happened to Claremont both commercially and architecturally." He further wrote the "Werdmuller is designed for interest and beauty throughout." Noëleen Murray, an architect and academic, wrote in 2013 that "The notions around 'saving' the Werdmuller as a key example of modern architecture sit rather uncomfortably with the building's legacy of apartheid-era segregationalist design and negative public sentiment." A 2014 article in the Mail & Guardian said the building is eccentric and polarising, "loved and hated in equal measure".
