= The Wayfinders =

Fantasy adventure television series

- Genre: Portal fantasy Adventure; Drama
- Created by: Jason Faller; Kynan Griffin
- Starring: Evan Nikolas Fields; Tamara Smart; Vincent Mattis; Sam Buchanan; Issy Knopfler; Lawrence Walker; Rowan Robinson; Felipe Cates; Kane Parks; Mackenzie Crook
- Composer: Jim Dooley
- Countries of origin: Ireland; United States
- Original language: English
- No. of series: 1
- No. of episodes: 6

Production
- Executive producers: Kynan Griffin; Jason Faller; Jennifer Griffin; Justin Partridge; Adam F. Goldberg; Hans Rodionoff
- Producers: Stephen Hall; Mike Jones
- Running time: 51 minutes
- Production companies: Dark Day Pictures; Arrowstorm Entertainment

Original release
- Network: Angel Studios
- Release: 28 April 2025 – present

The Wayfinders is a 2025 fantasy adventure television series created by Jason Faller and Kynan Griffin. The series premiered on Angel Studios on 28 April 2025. In September 2025, the series was renewed for a second season.

== Premise ==
A band of unlikely heroes journey through a fractured realm in search of unity, purpose, and power.

== Cast and characters ==
=== Main cast ===
- Evan Nikolas Fields as Flynn Griffin, the hardcore gamer destined to be the thief and leader of the Wayfinders.
- Tamara Smart as Oaklee Jones, the clever lone wolf destined to be the sorceress of the Wayfinders. While possessing a great potential, she's afraid of disappointing others who had great expectations in it.
- Vincent Mattis as Cash Calloway, the jock and top student destined to be the warrior of the Wayfinders.
- Sam Buchanan as Kavan, a young warrior cursed to become a werebear by Vedric.
- Issy Knopfler as Aurora Dardemane, the princess imprisoned by Vedric in his fortress at Daktu, West Sea, before the Wayfinders liberated her and she joined the party.
- Lawrence Walker as Calibor, a cynical bounty hunter and expert thief who is part of the resistance against Vedric's reign of terror alongside Zaya.
- Rowan Robinson as Zaya, the eccentric yet steadfast seeress who chose the titular members of the group.
- Felipe Cates as Vedric, the ruthless Prince of Tairngira who sought to dominate his world and Earth with Skull of Mardukh.
- Kane Parks as Darryl Griffin, the brother of Flynn chosen by Zaya as her ally in ensuring Earth is saved.
- Mackenzie Crook as Goran, the dark magic user and agent of Vedric sent to Earth to keep Skull of Marduk from Zaya's reach and kill her before she could choose the Wayfinders. He failed to kill her and the group ended up reaching his home realm via Void Key despite his efforts.

=== Supporting cast ===
- Wes Chatham as Mitch
- Jed Murray as Rawhead
- Nimmi Harasgama as Mrs. Patel
- Coulter Dittman as Chad
- Mimi Slinger as Keesha
- Emily Barber as Queen Aliana
- Madeleine Mantock as Sister Brendowyn
- Joe Sims as Riplaggish
- Nimmi Harasgama as Mrs. Matel
- Ian Gerard Whyte as Thraxus

== Episodes ==
No.	Title	Directed by	Written by	Original release date
1	"The Wayfinders"	Glen Winter	Jason Faller, Kynan Griffin	28 April 2025
Three high schoolers are catapulted into a brutal medieval realm torn apart by magic and war. Forced to rely on each other and a strange prophecy, they fight to survive and search for a way home.
2	"The Old Switcheroo"	Glen Winter	Jason Faller, Kynan Griffin	17 December 2025
Hunted by Vedric’s forces, the teens follow Aurora toward Calibor’s hidden village, meeting allies and dangers along the way. On Earth, Darryl uncovers a strange prophecy as the search for the missing students intensifies.
3	"Oakleaf of the Wayfinders"	Glen Winter	Adam F. Goldberg, Hans Rodionoff	24 December 2025
The Wayfinders arrive at Tyr-Valen, where each commits to a new path: Oaklee trains with clerics, Cash endures Kavan’s harsh instruction, and Flynn leans on Calibor's thieving expertise – until a magical mishap reveals how unprepared they truly are.
4	"Cash Bon Jovi"	Jon Wright	Justin Partridge	30 December 2025
Cash reinvents himself as a bard, drawing the attention of a deadly bounty hunter. Flynn and Oaklee attempt a rescue, sparking a tavern brawl. On Earth, Darryl’s break-in leads Zaya to the Skull of Mardukh, setting both worlds on a collision course.
5	"King Oleg's Crown"	Jon Wright	Jason Faller, Kynan Griffin	6 January 2026
A hunt for King Oleg’s crown plunges the group into a deadly labyrinth of traps, forcing Aurora and Calibor to confront their past betrayals. On Earth, Zaya’s visions reveal a doomed future as Goran closes in on Darryl.
6	"Trust Calibor"	Glen Winter	Jason Faller, Kynan Griffin	13 January 2026
The team races across Tairngire for the void key, but are drawn into a showdown at Rip’s keep. On Earth, Darryl and Zaya face growing danger as Goran resurfaces. Both worlds head toward a breaking point as alliances fray and impossible choices loom.

== Production ==
The series is directed by Glen Winter. It has Stephen Hall and Mike Jones as producers for Dark Day Pictures. It was made in conjunction with Camera 40 Productions. The pilot was produced with Arrowstorm Entertainment instead of Camera 40.

Filming took place in Limerick, Ireland in October 2023. Other filming locations have included Knappogue Castle and Cratloe Woods in County Clare, Cahir Castle, and locations near the Rock of Cashel in County Tipperary. As of the filming of second season, it was expected to be started around March 2026 and would take place in Utah and Limerick, Ireland but instead started at Charleville Castle, Tullamore, Ireland in April 2026.

== Release ==
The series released on Angel Studios on 28 April 2025 worldwide.
