= Sam Buchanan =

English actor

- Born: 21 June 1997 (age 29)
- Education: ArtsEd (BA)
- Occupation: Actor
- Years active: 2021-present

Sam Buchanan is an English television and film actor. His television roles include Such Brave Girls (2023). His film roles include Back to Black (2024) and My Fault: London (2025).

== Early life ==
He is from Kent. He left college with a Performing Arts BTEC and then graduated with a BA from the ArtsEd Acting program in 2019.

== Career ==
He had a role as Fitzy in EastEnders in May and June 2021, until the character became a victim of knife crime. He had a part in a not-for-profit verbatim production of the Grenfell Tower Inquiry, called Value Engineering which was filmed and broadcast on Channel 4 with the title Grenfell.

He had the role of Bash on 2023 video game Ten Dates. That year, he appeared as Billie's on/off boyfriend Nicky in Kat Sadler's British comedy drama series Such Brave Girls. He also appeared in Amazon Prime Video thriller series The Power.

In 2024, he could be seen as Nick Shymansky in the Amy Winehouse biopic Back to Black, the singer's early manager when she released her debut album, and a character who encouraged her to go to rehab. He appeared in HBO series Get Millie Black. That year, he featured in the second series of BBC One drama series Sherwood as Nicky Branson.

In 2025, he appeared as Ronnie Burns in the young adult romantic drama film My Fault: London. That year, he gained leading roles in BBC’s Just Act Normal, and could be seen in a lead role in The Wayfinders. He also launched his own independent production company, Silent Knight Productions, alongside Issy Knopfler, with the first film from the company being a short film titled Day Release which is also Buchanans' directorial debut, written and co-directed by Lewis Jamison.

In 2026, he reprised his role as Ronnie in Amazon prime’s Your Fault: London and starred in the sixth season of Miss Scarlet. That year he also signed with LA based management MGMT Entertainment, and theatrical agency Buchwald.

== Filmography ==
Year	Title	Role	Notes
2020	Casualty	Riley Bradburn	1 episode
2020	Doctors	Andrew Lovell	1 episode
2021	EastEnders	Fitzy	4 episodes
2022	Mood	Damien Yapz	1 episode
2023	The Power	Terry	3 episodes
2023–2025	Such Brave Girls	Nicky	9 episodes
2024	Back to Black	Nick Shymansky	Feature film
2024	Sherwood	Nicky Branson	2 episodes
2024	Get Millie Black	Harrison	1 episode
2025	My Fault: London	Ronnie	Film
2025	Just Act Normal	Dr. Feelgood	6 episodes
2025	The Wayfinders	Kavan	6 episodes
2026	Miss Scarlet	Detective Willows	Season 6
2026	Your Fault: London	Ronnie	Film
