= Tamara Smart =

English actress (born 2005)

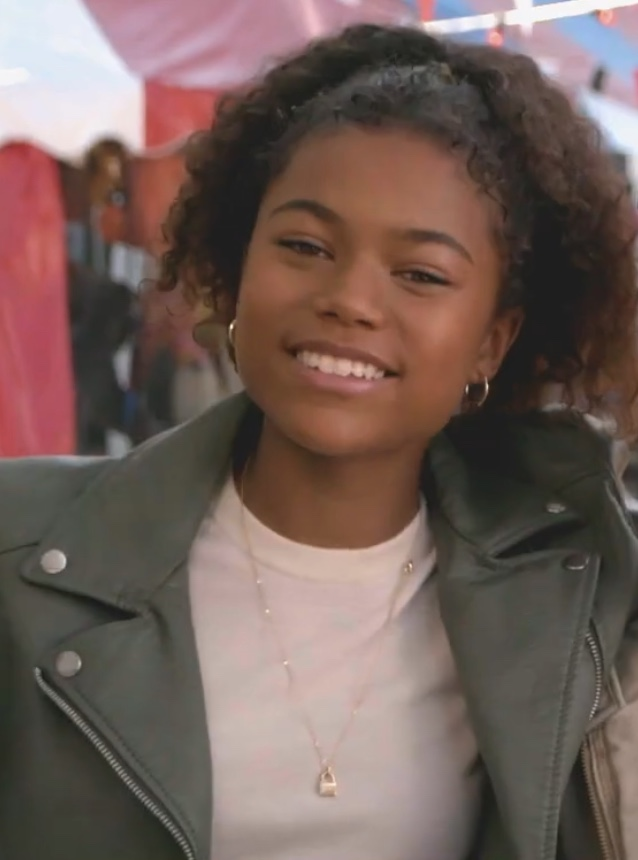
- Smart in 2019
- Born: Tamara Valerie Smart; 14 June 2005 (age 21); Barnet, London, England
- Occupation: Actress
- Years active: 2017–present

Tamara Valerie Smart (born 14 June 2005) is an English actress. She began her career as a child actress in the CBBC series The Worst Witch (2017–2020), the revival of the Nickelodeon horror anthology series Are You Afraid of the Dark? (2019), the Netflix series Resident Evil (2022) and the films Artemis Fowl and A Babysitter's Guide to Monster Hunting (both came out in 2020). She has since appeared in the Disney+ series Percy Jackson and the Olympians (2025-) and the Angel series The Wayfinders (2025–).

== Personal life ==
Smart was born in the North London Borough of Barnet to African-West Indian parents Fiona and Cornelius Smart. She took classes at Dance Crazy Studios and Razzamataz Theatre School Barnet.

== Career ==
In 2017, Smart made her acting debut as Enid Nightshade in the CBBC series The Worst Witch. In 2018, she had a starring role as Hailey Hicks in drama series Hard sun. In 2019, she starred as Louise Fulci in the new revival of the Nickelodeon horror anthology series Are You Afraid of the Dark?. In 2020, Smart was cast to play Juliet Butler In the science fantasy adventure film Artemis Fowl. Also In 2020, Smart played a major role as Kelly Ferguson in the dark fantasy comedy film A Babysitter's Guide to Monster Hunting. In 2022, Smart starred as Jade Wesker in the action horror series Resident Evil. She voiced the character Siobhan in the stop-motion animated film Wendell & Wild.

In September 2024, Smart was cast as Thalia Grace in the second season of the Disney+ series Percy Jackson and the Olympians.

== Filmography ==
=== Film ===
Year	Title	Role	Notes
2020	Artemis Fowl	Juliet Butler	Disney+ film
2020	A Babysitter's Guide to Monster Hunting	Kelly Ferguson	Netflix film
2022	Wendell & Wild	Siobhan Klaxon	Netflix film, voice role
TBA	Watch Dogs	Amy	Post-production

=== Television ===
Year	Title	Role	Notes
2017–2020	The Worst Witch	Enid Nightshade	Main role (43 episodes)
2018	Hard Sun	Hailey Hicks	3 episodes
2019	Are You Afraid of the Dark?	Louise Fulci	Main role (season 1)
2022	Resident Evil	young Jade Wesker	Main role
2025–present	Percy Jackson and the Olympians	Thalia Grace	Main role
2025–present	The Wayfinders	Oaklee Jones	Main role
