= The Blame (TV series) =

British television series

- Genre: Crime drama
- Based on: The Blame by Charlotte Langley
- Screenplay by: Megan Gallagher; Ashley Sanders; Namsi Khan
- Directed by: Bex Rycroft; Claire Tailyour
- Starring: Michelle Keegan; Douglas Booth
- Composer: Sarah Warne
- Country of origin: United Kingdom
- Original language: English
- No. of series: 1
- No. of episodes: 6

Production
- Executive producers: Megan Gallagher; Polly Hill; Nicola Shindler; Richard Fee
- Producer: Matt Strevens
- Running time: 47 minutes
- Production companies: Quay Street Productions; Fifth Season

Original release
- Network: ITVX
- Release: 20 September 2026

The Blame is a 2026 British crime drama television series starring Michelle Keegan and Douglas Booth, adapted from the novel of the same name by Charlotte Langley. It was released on ITVX on 20 September 2026.

== Premise ==
Police investigate after the body of a young figure skater is discovered in a quiet town.

== Cast ==
- Michelle Keegan as DI Emma Crane
- Douglas Booth as DI Tom Radley
- Nathan Mensah as DC Lewis Brimah
- Nigel Boyle as Neil Shergill
- Joe Armstrong as Coach Kyle Frasier
- Matilda Freeman as Sophie Madsen
- Gavin Spokes as DC Joel Stevens
- Josh Bolt as DC Douglas James
- Ian Hart as DCI Kenneth Walker
- Ceallach Spellman as PC Callum Drummond
- Tiahna Krenek as Mila Brimah

== Episodes ==
Series	Episodes	Originally released	
Series	Episodes	First released	Last released
1	6	20 September 2026	5 October 2026

No.	Title	Directed by	Written by	Original release date	U.K. viewers (millions)
1	"1.1"	Rebecca Rycroft	Charlotte Langley & Megan Gallagher	20 September 2026	5.23
2	"1.2"	Rebecca Rycroft	Charlotte Langley & Megan Gallagher	21 September 2026	3.94
3	"1.3"	Rebecca Rycroft	Charlotte Langley & Ashley Sanders	27 September 2026	5.86
4	"1.4"	Claire Tailyour	Charlotte Langley & Megan Gallagher	28 September 2026	5.92
5	"1.5"	Claire Tailyour	Charlotte Langley & Megan Gallagher	4 October 2026	6.39
6	"1.6"	Claire Tailyour	Charlotte Langley & Megan Gallagher	5 October 2026	6.71

== Production ==
The six-part series is adapted by Megan Gallagher with co-writers Ashley Sanders and Namsi Khan from the 2023 novel of the same name by Charlotte Langley. The series is produced by Quay Street Productions with Fifth Season co-producing and handling international sales. Bex Rycroft and Claire Tailyour both directed episodes. Matt Strevens is the series producer, with Sara Huxley as co-producer. Gallagher is an executive producer with Polly Hill, Nicola Shindler and Richard Fee. As part of the exploration of everyday sexism, the script uses actual text messages recorded in the Metropolitan Police group chat scandals by officers guilty of misconduct.

The cast is led by Michelle Keegan and Douglas Booth and includes Nathan Mensah, Nigel Boyle, Joe Armstrong, Matilda Freeman, Gavin Spokes, Josh Bolt, Ian Hart and Ceallach Spellman.

Filming took place in London and Hertfordshire in the summer of 2025. Filming locations included Hertford. First-look images from the set were released to the media in September 2025, followed by a teaser in June 2026.

== Broadcast ==
The series premiered on 20 September 2026.
