= Rowan Robinson =

English actress

- Born: Eve Rowan Robinson; 25 April 2001 (age 25); Salford, England
- Other name: Rowan Robinson
- Education: RADA
- Occupation: Actress
- Years active: 2019–present

Rowan Robinson is an English actress. On television, she is known for her roles in the ITV thriller Passenger (2024), the Angel fantasy series The Wayfinders (2025–) and the final series of the Sky Max comedy Brassic (2025). She also appeared in the film A Haunting in Venice (2023).

== Early life and education ==
Robinson is from Salford. She studied musical theatre at Pendleton College and later trained at RADA.

== Career ==
Initially credited as Eve Rowan, Robinson made her television debut in a 2019 episode of the CBBC sitcom So Awkward. A member of Meighan Youth Theatre, Robinson appeared as Abigail Williams in a stage production of Arthur Miller's The Crucible at Altrincham Garrick. She played Velma Kelly in a performance of Chicago at Waterside Arts Centre in Sale, Greater Manchester in 2019. Additionally, she appeared in several productions with the youth theatre company Manchester Musical Youth.

Robinson made her feature film debut as Alicia Drake in the Kenneth Branagh 2023 film A Haunting in Venice, a loose adaptation of Agatha Christie's 1969 novel Hallowe'en Party.

In 2024, she appeared as Jo, alongside Jill Halfpenny, in a stage production of Shelagh Delaney's classic play A Taste of Honey at the Royal Exchange, Manchester. She received praise for her performance, including Mark Brown in The Daily Telegraph describing her as "superb" and Clive Davis in The Times describing her a "mercurial presence" who delivers a "remarkably mature performance". She also appeared as part of Sir Trevor Nunn's A Man For All Time: Shakespeare Masterclass.

In March 2024, Robinson starred as Katie Wells in the Andrew Buchan written ITVX television series Passenger. She appeared as Rowan "Red" Fossoway in the HBO fantasy series A Knight of the Seven Kingdoms, a Game of Thrones prequel.

== Filmography ==
Key
†	Denotes works that have not yet been released

Year	Title	Role	Notes
2019	So Awkward	Jodie	Episode: "Head Boy Hearts Girl"
2022	Gym		Short films
2022	Am I Who	Sam	Short films
2022	The Fight in the Dog	Al	Short films
2023	A Haunting in Venice	Alicia Drake	
2024	Passenger	Katie Wells	Main role, 6 episodes
2025	A Cruel Love: The Ruth Ellis Story	Vicki Martin	2 episodes
2025–present	The Wayfinders	Zaya	Main role
2025	Brassic	Ally	Main role (series 7)
2026	A Knight of the Seven Kingdoms	Rowan "Red" Fossoway	4 episodes
