= Roelof Uytenbogaardt =

South African architect and urban designer (1933–1998)

- Uytenbogaardt in October 1962
- Born: Roelof Sarel Uytenbogaardt; 23 June 1933; Cape Town, Cape Province, Union of South Africa
- Died: 22 June 1998 (aged 64); Cape Town, Western Cape, South Africa
- Education: Voortrekker High School; University of Cape Town; University of Pennsylvania
- Occupation: Architect
- Years active: 1955–1998
- Spouse: Marianne
- Awards: Sophia Grey Laureate (1990); Gold Medal Award – South African Institute of Architects (1998); Medal of Honour for Architecture – Suid-Afrikaanse Akademie vir Wetenskap en Kuns (1998, posthumously)
- Buildings: Werdmuller Centre; UCT Sport Centre
- Design: Brutalism; Modernism

Roelof Sarel Uytenbogaardt (23 June 1933 – 22 June 1998) was a South African architect and urban designer. He was the dean and deputy dean of the Faculty of Architecture and Fine Art at the University of Cape Town. Uytenbogaardt designed brutalist and modernist buildings in Cape Town and the surrounding cities and towns during his career.

== Early life and education ==
Uytenbogaardt was born on 23 June 1933 in Cape Town in what was then the Cape Province of the Union of South Africa. He matriculated from Voortrekker High School in Wynberg. Between 1955 and 1956, he worked as an assistant to the architects Koppel Brown in Kitwe, Northern Rhodesia, where he worked on an African market as well as House Hepworth.

He graduated first class from the University of Cape Town with a Bachelor of Architecture in 1956. The following year, he became the first South African to be awarded a Royal Institute of British Architects Prix de Rome scholarship. In 1958 and 1959 he was awarded both a Penn and a Kahn Scholarship to study at the University of Pennsylvania, from which he graduated with master's degrees in architecture and city planning in 1961.

== Architectural career ==
Uytenbogaardt was the chief planning designer and project planning officer at the Boston Redevelopment Authority from 1961 until 1963. In 1963, he returned to Cape Town and became an assistant studio master at the University of Cape Town. He also opened an architecture firm "Uytenbogaardt and Pelser" with PJ Pelser. He designed the Hugo van Zyl retail store in Paarl, which received the Cape Provincial Institute of Architects (CPIA) Bronze Medal in 1964.

Uytenbogaardt opened his own firm in 1965. Uytenbogaardt became a senior lecturer at UCT in 1967 before becoming the head of the department of city planning and regional planning at the university in 1970. By 1971, he was a member of the university's Senate and the deputy dean of the Faculty of Fine Art and Architecture. He was a senior partner of the firm Uytenbogaardt Schneider Macaskill Architects in 1971. He became dean of the faculty and designed the UCT Sports Centre in 1977. By 1979, he was deputy dean of the faculty again and a new firm, Uytenbogaardt and Rozendal, was also established. In 1981, he designed the sport complex and stadium at the University of the Western Cape. Uytenbogaardt designed House Uytenbogaardt in Kommetjie in 1992.

== Death ==
Uytenbogaardt died on 22 June 1998, shortly after receiving the gold medal for Architecture award by the South African Institute of Architects. He was married to Marianne.

== Awards and accolades ==
Uytenbogaardt received many awards for his architectural work, among them:

- Sophia Gray Laureate (1990)
- Gold Medal for Architecture - South African Institute of Architecture (1998)
- Medal of Honour for Architecture - Suid-Afrikaanse Akademie vir Wetenskap en Kuns (1998, posthumously)
