= Joe Ballarini =

American film director, screenwriter and author

- Born: Joseph Ballarini
- Education: University of Southern California (BA)
- Occupations: film director, screenwriter, author
- Notable work: Ice Age: Continental Drift, Epic, Turbo, My Little Pony: The Movie
- Website: JoeBallarini.com

Joe Ballarini is an American film director, screenwriter and author. He graduated from the USC School of Cinematic Arts Television Director's Program with a degree in film production in 1999.

== Career ==
At USC film school, Ballarini wrote and directed the award-winning "pre-apocalyptic" film Nuclear Family produced by Michael Huffington.

In 2002, Ballarini sold an original action comedy screenplay The Spy Next Door to Dimension Films for US $600,000. The following year he sold the script for a family adventure film titled The Legendary McClouds to Paramount Pictures with Nickelodeon producing. He wrote a paranormal kids film Spooks for Miramax as well as The Blob for Warner Bros. with Jon Peters producing. In 2003, Ballarini directed a series of nationally broadcast Honda Element commercials produced by Daniel Dubiecki.

Ballarini sold the script to his feature comedy F+ to Metro-Goldwyn-Mayer in 2004, which he was also attached to direct. 20th Century Fox also hired Ballarini to direct Adam Sztykiel's screenplay Ditch Day with State Street producing.

In 2007, New Regency commissioned Ballarini to write a script for a biblical epic film, The Nativity.

Ballarini made his feature length screenwriting debut with Dance of the Dead, an independent zombie comedy, directed by Gregg Bishop. The film premiered at the South by Southwest Film Festival in 2008 and received positive reviews from critics. Film critic Todd Brown said of Ballarini's work on Dance, "[It has] marked him as a talent to watch, someone with an unusual ability to balance tones and character and comedy to create something really quite special." Ballarini also served as Second Unit Director on Dance of the Dead.

In 2009, Jerry Bruckheimer purchased Ballarini's script for The Residence, a film about a paranormalist hired to investigate a haunting in the White House.

In 2010, Warner Bros. began developing the comic book series Maintenance as a live-action feature film directed by McG, for which Ballarini wrote the script. That same year, Ballarini co-wrote and directed the independent film Father vs. Son, a screwball comedy in which a father and his son fall in love with the same woman, which was produced by Michael Huffington. It starred Paul Wolff, Eric Stonestreet, and Cameron Goodman, and debuted at the 2nd annual Beverly Hills Film Festival. The film was also screened at the WorldFest-Houston International Film Festival, where it won best feature film debut. Later that year, One Race Films hired Ballarini to write and direct episodes of The Ropes, a television drama series about bouncers in New York City produced by Vin Diesel.

Ballarini again teamed up with Gregg Bishop to write the script for Lockdown at Franklin High on spec, which sold to Sony Pictures Entertainment in March 2012 with Michael Bay attached as a producer. Lockdown is about two siblings who are trapped in their high school during a lockdown while a monster wanders the campus. He was also an uncredited writer for Ice Age: Continental Drift, which was released in July 2012.

In 2012, Joe Ballarini directed a short horror film about a clown visiting a man on his 35th birthday entitled Buckles.

In 2013, Ballarini directed Caitlin Carmichael, Andrea Guttag, and Justin Welborn in another short horror film about a girl befriending the monster under her bed entitled Bedbug. New Line Cinema commissioned Ballarini to write a script for Merlin, a then-untitled high concept action fantasy film set in medieval times.

20th Century Fox Animation began developing an animated version of the graphic novel Cardboard in 2014 about a young boy and his father who must battle cardboard monsters that magically come to life, for which Ballarini wrote the adapted screenplay.

In 2015, Hasbro Studios announced its plans to release a theatrical My Little Pony movie based on the television series My Little Pony: Friendship Is Magic by 2017, and Ballarini was brought on to write the script. Although Ballarini wasn’t involved in the film’s final writing stages, his comedic influence and style was able to make it into the film.

Ballarini has been commissioned to write numerous other film and television scripts including Turbo, The Robot, and Witchhunters.

=== Books ===
HarperCollins imprint Katherine Tegen Books acquired publication rights to Ballarini's three-book series A Babysitter's Guide to Monsters in April 2015 and plans to publish the books in late 2016 or early 2017. The story follows a teen girl searching for the child she was babysitting after the child is kidnapped by monsters. Walden Media and The Montecito Picture Company have bought movie rights to A Babysitter's Guide to Monsters. The film was released in 2020, with Ballarini writing the screenplay.

== Filmography ==
- The Spy Next Door (in development) - Screenwriter
- The Legendary McClouds (in development) - Screenwriter
- Dance of the Dead (2008) - Screenwriter, Second Unit Director
- Father vs. Son (2010) - Director, screenwriter
- Lockdown at Franklin High (in development) - Screenwriter
- Ice Age: Continental Drift (2012) - Uncredited writer
- Epic - Uncredited writer
- Turbo - Uncredited writer
- BUCKLES (short, 2012) - Director
- Bedbug (short, 2013) - Director
- My Little Pony: The Movie (2017) - Co-story writer alongside Meghan McCarthy
- A Babysitter's Guide to Monster Hunting (2020) - Screenwriter
