= List of In Plain Sight cast members =

For more detailed character information, see List of In Plain Sight characters.

Below is a list of actors and actresses that are or were part of the cast of the American drama television series In Plain Sight.

The show's main stars have included, at some point, Mary McCormack, Fred Weller, Nichole Hiltz, Todd Williams, Lesley Ann Warren, Paul Ben-Victor, Cristián de la Fuente, and Rachel Boston.

== Cast ==
Starring

Recurring/Guest

No appearances

Character	Season				
Character	Season One (2008)	Season Two (2009)	Season Three (2010)	Season Four (2011)	Season Five (2012)
=== Main cast ===
Mary Shannon	Mary McCormack	Mary McCormack	Mary McCormack	Mary McCormack	Mary McCormack
Marshall Mann	Fred Weller	Fred Weller	Fred Weller	Fred Weller	Fred Weller
Brandi Shannon	Nichole Hiltz	Nichole Hiltz	Nichole Hiltz	Nichole Hiltz	Nichole Hiltz
Jinx Shannon	Lesley Ann Warren	Lesley Ann Warren	Lesley Ann Warren	Lesley Ann Warren	Lesley Ann Warren
Stan McQueen	Paul Ben-Victor	Paul Ben-Victor	Paul Ben-Victor	Paul Ben-Victor	Paul Ben-Victor
Raphael "Raph" Ramirez	Cristián de la Fuente	Cristián de la Fuente	Cristián de la Fuente		Cristián de la Fuente
Robert "Bobby D" Dershowitz	Todd Williams	Todd Williams			
Det. Abigail Chaffee				Rachel Boston	Rachel Boston
=== Family and friends ===
Chuck Johnson	Tim Kelleher	Tim Kelleher			
Peter Alpert		Joshua Malina	Joshua Malina	Joshua Malina	
Special Agent Mike Faber			Steven Weber		
Scott Griffin			Aaron Ashmore		Aaron Ashmore
Seth Mann			Geoff Pierson		Geoff Pierson
Hal Alpert				Ken Lerner	
Dora Alpert				Randee Heller	
Mark Stuber				Bryan Callen	Bryan Callen
Lia Hernandez					Tia Carrere
Joanna Stuber					Mimi Kennedy
James Wiley Shannon					Stephen Lang
Kenny					Josh Hopkins
=== Other government employees ===
Special Agent Robert O'Conner	Will McCormack	Will McCormack			Will McCormack
Eleanor Prince		Holly Maples			
Dr. Shelly Finkel		Ali Marsh		Ali Marsh	Ali Marsh
Allison Pearson			Allison Janney		
Charlie Connor			Keith Nobbs		
Theresa Simmons			Erika Alexander		
A.U.S.A. Boswell			Grant Albrecht	Grant Albrecht	Grant Albrecht
Delia Parmalee				Tangie Ambrose	Tangie Ambrose
A.U.S.A. Perillo				Ray Abruzzo	Ray Abruzzo
Fred Zeitlin				Dan Bucatinsky	Dan Bucatinsky
=== Enemies ===
Rachel Miller	Jenny Gabrielle				
Neil "Spanky" Carson	Mark Boone Junior				
Lala		Luis Moncada	Luis Moncada		
Cormack "Sully" Sullivan					Steve Eastin
=== Witnesses ===
Tasha Turischeva / Tasha Somova	Angela Sarafyan				
Ronnie Dalembert / Ronnie McIntire				Maury Sterling	Maury Sterling
Carlos Ramirez				Robert LaSardo	Robert LaSardo
Christy Owens				Lauren Petzke	Lauren Petzke
=== Minor characters ===
Dr. Bronstein		John Dennis Johnston	John Dennis Johnston		
Mrs. Anders				Patricia Belcher	
