= Father Goes West =

- In Plain Sight episode
- Episode no.: Season 3 Episode 1
- Directed by: Charles Haid
- Written by: John McNamara
- Production code: 3_301
- Original air date: March 31, 2010

Guest appearances
- John Dennis Johnston as Dr. Bronstein; Sean Marquette as Nicky McCabe / Porter; Susan Santiago as Emily Porter; Walter Perez as Leo Olarte; Luis Moncada as Lala; Donnie Wahlberg as Jimmy McCabe / Porter

Episode chronology
← Previous "Don't Cry for Me, Albuquerque"	Next → "When Mary Met Marshall"

"Father Goes West" is the third-season premiere episode of In Plain Sight and the 28th episode overall. Originally designed to be the second of a two-part second-season finale, the show's creators decided to end the season in cliffhanger fashion. This episode was slated as the third-season premiere and aired on March 31, 2010.

== Summary ==
After being discharged from the hospital with a fresh bullet wound scar, Mary gets right back to work with Marshall. They come across what appears to be video footage of an armed robbery that looks suspiciously similar to the robberies that one of their witnesses, Jimmy McCabe (Donnie Wahlberg); used to orchestrate as a mobster in Boston, MA.

After grilling McCabe, Mary turns her attention to Jimmy's sons who are doing their best to conceal the truth about their dad.

Meanwhile, Marshall's presence in gangland is starting to hurt gang-banger Lala's (Luis Moncada) business. But Marshall is looking for the name of Mary's shooter. It's only a matter of time before Lala's proximity to the cops ruins his business, and before Marshall gets in too deep.

Jinx doesn't provide the warmest homecoming for Mary when she blames her for putting the family through hell while she was in the hospital. Also, Peter begins to suspect that Brandi's mysterious phone calls aren't as innocent as she's making them sound.

== Trivia ==
- Originally slated to be the second of a two-part season finale, the creators decided to start the third season with this episode in order to leave Mary's fate in suspense. The first half of the episode entitled "Don't Cry for Me, Albuquerque," aired on August 9, 2009.
- Francesca Garcia / Leandra (portrayed by Angelica Castro) can be seen in this episode but as archive footage from the previous episode.
- Holly Maples leaves the cast. Her character Eleanor Prince, leaves WITSEC to take a position as an analyst with the FBI.
- After this episode cast members Todd Williams, Lesley Ann Warren, Cristian de la Fuente, and Joshua Malina are dropped down to recurring roles to take emphasis off Mary's personal life.
- This episode pulled 3.81 million views in the Nielsen ratings.

== Cast ==
Mary McCormack	Marshal Mary Shannon
Fred Weller	Marshal Marshall Mann
Paul Ben-Victor	Chief Stan McQueen

=== Supporting cast ===
Nichole Hiltz	Brandi Shannon
Lesley Ann Warren	Jinx Shannon
Cristián de la Fuente	Raphael Ramirez
Joshua Malina	Peter Alpert
