= Don't Cry for Me, Albuquerque =

- In Plain Sight episode
- Episode no.: Season 2 Episode 15
- Directed by: Michael Morris
- Written by: Jessica Butler
- Production code: 2_215
- Original air date: August 9, 2009

Guest appearances
- J.C. MacKenzie; Luis Moncada; John Dennis Johnston; Angelica Castro; Juan-Carlos Guzman; Eric Martinez; Manuel Chavez; Jacob O'Brien Mulliken; Vivian Nesbitt; Arthur Wooldridge; Matt Sanford

Episode chronology
← Previous "Once a Ponzi Time"	Next → "Father Goes West"

"Don't Cry for Me, Albuquerque" is the second-season finale episode of In Plain Sight and the 27th episode overall. Originally designed to be the first of a two-part season finale, the show's creators decided to end the season in cliffhanger fashion. The companion episode was slated as the third-season premiere and aired on March 31, 2010 ("Father Goes West").

== Summary ==
Thanks to the State Department, Mary's new "best friend" is a feisty South American woman, Francesca Leandra (guest star Angelica Castro): a revolutionary leader whom the U.S. government has agreed to hide in the states while they help agitate her countrymen toward rebelling against their dictator. To stir the pot even more, the CIA is quietly spreading the word that Francesca, who is beloved by the working-class citizens, has been captured by El Presidente's men and is being tortured. Her country of origin is never specified.

Mary and Francesca are established in a mansion in Albuquerque with top-of-the-line security and every possible amenity. Francesca, fearing that her people will discover that she was living in luxury while they suffered under El Presidente, talks the State Department liaison into allowing her to move into a house in one of Albuquerque's barrios (Latin/Hispanic slum). When Marshall and Mary confront her about this, citing the drug-dealing gang across the street from Francesca's new 'safe' house, Francesca insists they are her 'people' and are just like the boys she grew up with in South America. Mary makes a call into APD dispatch and pretends to be an ordinary citizen calling in a disturbance, hoping that a police cruiser driving past will disperse the gang and head off the trouble she senses is coming. The cruiser doesn't come, however, and Mary's instincts are dead-on.

Mario, one of the dealers that had come across and flirted with Mary and Francesca earlier, comes back across the street and tries to get the girls to let him in so they can 'party'. Francesca says to ignore him, but Mary knows that won't work. She has already called Bobby Dershowitz to try to get another cruiser to come by; Dershowitz comes himself to try to defuse the situation. Mary exits the house and pushes Mario off the porch when Dershowitz is becoming outnumbered by Mario's compadres, and when Mario draws, Mary draws her own weapon and is shot in the abdomen. As soon as the shot rings out the dealers scatter, while Dershowitz calls for help on his phone.

Mary is rushed to the hospital; she has lost a large volume of blood, is unconscious and goes into cardiac arrest in the ambulance; though she is revived, she does not regain consciousness due to low blood volume. Marshall is the first to arrive as she is being wheeled into emergency, and he pleads with her not to die; after being barred from coming into the trauma room with her, he crumples to the floor in tears as Stan arrives, sobbing that she still wasn't breathing.

Jinx, Brandi and Raphael arrive while Marshall is talking to Stan about how bad the situation was at the house, fearing the worst when they see how upset Marshall is. After assuring them that Mary is alive, Stan arranges for a private waiting room with the nursing staff for the family to wait in; Francesca arrives with State Department escorts, determined to wait until she knows Mary will be all right before they relocate her. The State Department liaison pulls Stan out of the waiting room and proceeds to blame Mary for the need to relocate Francesca; he starts to promise that he will destroy Mary's career when Stan loses his temper and shoves the man into an empty hospital room, exploding that Mary might die because they moved Francesca into that neighborhood against WITSEC recommendation and that a complaint has already been filed by WITSEC about the incident.

Marshall refuses to speak with Francesca, blaming her for the incident, and Stan leaves to work with the police to track down the shooter. The doctor advises the family and Marshall that Mary has lost too much blood to continue surgery, and that her condition must be stabilized before they can continue. Stan calls from the task force headquarters to find out why Francesca hasn't given a statement, even though she was a witness; when Marshall challenges her about it, she admits to Marshall that she will not give a statement because she thinks Mary brought the shooting on herself by calling the cops, calling it an overreaction. She also claims that Mario didn't shoot Mary, an assertion which is later proven by ballistic evidence.

The leader of the drug-dealing gang is brought in for questioning, and Marshall tries to tempt him into providing information in exchange for WITSEC relocation: a whole new life, new identity, a chance to do anything he's ever wanted and going anyplace he's dreamed of seeing. The dealer refuses to give information, and the investigation begins to stall. Stan and Marshall return to the hospital to wait while Francesca is finally relocated by the State Department, unable to wait any longer. The last shot of the episode shows Mary in intensive care.

== Trivia ==
- Originally slated to be the first of a two-part season finale, the creators decided to end the season with this episode and leave Mary's fate in suspense.
- This episode pulled 4.44 million views in the Nielsen ratings.

== Cast ==
Mary McCormack	Marshal Mary Shannon
Fred Weller	Marshal Marshall Mann
Paul Ben-Victor	Chief Stan McQueen

=== Supporting cast ===
Nichole Hiltz	Brandi Shannon
Lesley Ann Warren	Jinx Shannon
Holly Maples	Eleanor Prince
Todd Williams	Detective Robert Dershowitz
Cristián de la Fuente	Raphael Ramirez
Joshua Malina	Peter Alpert
