= List of In Plain Sight characters =

This is a list of characters in the USA Network original drama TV series In Plain Sight, which follows two U.S. marshals working in the witness protection program. The principal cast has undergone many changes over the course of the show. Additionally, various recurring characters have appeared during the show's run.

== Main characters ==
Name	Portrayed by	Occupation/Status	Seasons				
Name	Portrayed by	Occupation/Status	1	2	3	4	5
Marshal Mary Shannon	Mary McCormack	WitSec Inspector	Main				
Marshal Marshall Mann	Fred Weller	WitSec Inspector; Mary's best friend	Main				
Brandi Shannon	Nichole Hiltz	Mary's younger sister	Main				Recurring
Jinx Shannon	Lesley Ann Warren	Mary and Brandi's recovering alcoholic mother	Main		Recurring		
Stan McQueen	Paul Ben-Victor	WitSec Chief Inspector; Mary and Marshall's boss	Recurring	Main			
Raphael "Raph" Ramirez	Cristián de la Fuente	Mary's ex-fiancé	Recurring	Main	Recurring	—N/a	Recurring
Detective Robert "Bobby D" Dershowitz	Todd Williams	Homicide detective	Main		—N/a		
Detective Abigail Chaffee	Rachel Boston	Homicide detective	—N/a			Recurring	Main
Inspector Delia Parmalee	Tangie Ambrose	WitSec Inspector, Mary and Marshall’s coworker	—N/a			Recurring	Main

=== Mary Shannon ===
Marshal Mary Shannon (Mary McCormack) is a US marshal working in witness protection. She is a sharp-tongued nonconformist, often leading to difficulties. Her father, a gambler, left her childhood family after robbing a bank. Mary's issues, stemming from her father's abandonment and her mother's alcoholism, has saved the lives of some of her witnesses.

Throughout the first season, Mary almost constantly fights with her mother, Jinx, and her sister, Brandi. She is unable to understand why they cannot obtain and hold steady jobs, which often leads to conflict. Meanwhile, Mary is dating Raphael ("Raph"), a minor league baseball player. He finds her difficult at times, but ultimately loves her. In the season finale, a two-part episode including "Stan by Me" (1.11) and "A Fine Meth" (1.12), Mary is kidnapped and Brandi is charged with and almost convicted of distributing drugs due to Brandi's usual poor choice in men.

During the second season, Mary's family continues to annoy her, but she can see past it more often. She becomes engaged to Raph, though she has feelings of uncertainty at times. She is, however, able to trust him enough to reveal the true nature of her job to him. Throughout the season, a new office manager, Eleanor Prince, is hired. Mary immediately decides she doesn't like her, but eventually, they become mild friends. In the second-season finale, "Don't Cry for Me, Albuquerque" (2.15), Mary is shot while defending a witness. Marshall, Mary's partner, and Stan, her boss, work together to find the person who shot her. They eventually do, but Mary is still in danger of losing her life.

The third season opens with Mary being released from the hospital, very much alive and ready to get back to work. Very early on, Raph calls off their wedding. Soon, Mary meets FBI Special Agent Mike Faber, who asks her on a date. She refuses. Soon, Mary and Brandi's half brother, Scott Griffin enters their lives. She is very skeptical of his motives, especially when he asks Brandi to give him money. They learn he is addicted to gambling, much like their father. Mary becomes increasingly annoyed with Brandi, and it comes to a peak when she actually hands the money over to Scott. By the season finale, "A Priest Walks Into a Bar" (3.13), Mary and Faber had started dating. At the start of the fourth season, Mary had already ended the relationship with Faber in order to give him the opportunity to try to work things out with his ex-wife. In the fifth episode of the season, "Second Crime Around", it is revealed that she has an ex-husband, Mark, whom she married at 17 but divorced soon after. In the sixth episode of the fourth season, "Something A-mish", she finds out that she is pregnant by Mark after one night together. The pregnancy of Mary is written in to incorporate the real-life pregnancy of Mary McCormack. She gave birth to her daughter, Norah, in "Something Borrowed, Something Blew Up" (4.13).

In the fifth and final season, Mary has to deal with the return (and later death) of her father, her feelings for Marshall, her mother and sister's unexpected return, and major changes to the WITSEC office. In the finale, she gives her blessings to Marshall and Abigail.

McCormack made a guest appearance as Mary Shannon in the Law & Order: Criminal Intent episode "Contract".

=== Marshall Mann ===
Marshal Marshall Mann (Fred Weller) is a fifth-generation US marshal, but the first to work in WitSec, which leads to friction between him and his father. Marshall is Mary's partner and best friend. He has a lot of insights about many things, which Mary dismisses as "useless information". He is laconic and usually laid-back, unlike Mary, so their ways of thinking and acting can differ greatly, leading to conflicts at times. However, they are both extremely protective of their witnesses.

During the first season, Marshall begins to bond with various characters, most notably Bobby D. Upon their first meeting, the two clashed. However, during Mary's disappearance, the two were able to work together, and eventually become close friends.

In the second season, Marshall discovers that Mary has revealed the true nature of her job to Raphael. It is one of the few times he is visibly angry with Mary, going so far as to lash out at her. When he discovers her engagement, he is clearly shocked and later in his engagement toast goes as far as to say that he loves her, but neither of them seem to acknowledge what he has really said. In the season finale, "Don't Cry for Me, Albuquerque" (2.15), after Mary is shot, Marshall is deeply affected, even breaking down and crying in front of Stan.

After Mary and Raphael call off their engagement, in the finale of season three, "A Priest Walks Into a Bar" (3.13), Marshall appears to want to say something to Mary about how he feels, but is interrupted by Stan and does not try to renew the conversation. In the fourth season, Marshall finally realizes he and Mary are not right for each other and he begins a relationship with a police officer, Abigail, moving in with her. In "The Merry Wives of WITSEC" (5.04), Marshall proposes to Abigail. In the series finale, Marshall told Mary that he loved her and he would always be there for her, but he wanted her to be okay with Abigail, because he loves Abigail deeply and wants the freedom to be with her. Mary gave her blessing. In the series finale, it is revealed that Marshall is Stan's replacement as chief inspector for WitSec's Southwest region.

=== Brandi Shannon ===
Brandi Katherine Shannon (Nichole Hiltz) is Mary's sister, who is naïve, resistant to advice, and often enabling of others' bad choices. Mary usually refers to her as "Squish". Brandi rarely thinks about the future, preferring to live in the moment. She believes she can get by on only her charms. However, she considers Mary to be role model and an example. She at first is loyal to her mother, but slowly develops her independence and doesn't need her mother's approval. She initially obnoxiously calls Raph "Chico" but later learns to treat him with the respect he is due.

During the first season, Brandi is involved romantically with Chuck Johnson, who lives thousands of miles away in the Shannons' native New Jersey. Mary and Jinx know virtually nothing about him, and they (especially Mary) don't approve of him. Their suspicions are confirmed when Brandi travels to New Jersey, and is implicated in a major drug deal initiated by Chuck. During the deal, she discovers that one of the dealers, a meth addict, has a young infant, and calls child services to protect the baby. Soon after, Chuck is kidnapped, and two FBI agents are killed. The kidnappers also kidnap Mary by mistake, thinking she is Brandi. Mary is chained to a post in a basement, nearly raped before being executed, but just manages to free herself and kill her would be rapist. Investigators soon realize there is a connection between the drug trafficking and the kidnapping, and begin to draw up charges. However, when no drugs can be found at the Shannons' home, the charges are dropped. Brandi says that, had she known what was going to happen, she would have killed Chuck.

Soon after, in the second season, Robert O'Conner (played by actor Will McCormack, real-life brother of star Mary McCormack), the agent in charge of the drug trafficking case, returns to arrest Brandi for drug trafficking and murder. Mary, however, is able to convince him to back off; this time, for good. Jinx, meanwhile, convinces Brandi to begin attending court-ordered AA meetings in her name. Brandi does, and meets Peter Alpert (Joshua Malina) while there. At first, he is disgusted with her for making a mockery of the system that lead him to become sober. However, they eventually begin a relationship. Brandi later learns he is one of the richest men in Albuquerque, and subsequently tries to get him to break up with her, believing he has many mistresses. This turns out to be untrue and he does not break up with her.

Throughout season three, Brandi and Peter continue dating. When Mary and Brandi's half-brother, Scott Griffin, enters their lives, Brandi trusts him fully, while Mary does not. Although she knows he is a compulsive gambler, Brandi borrows thousands of dollars from Peter to give to Scott. Peter is happy to do so, despite Mary's vehement protests. By the season finale, "A Priest Walks Into a Bar" (3.13), Brandi has moved in with Peter. The two announced their engagement in "The Art of the Steal" (4.01). However, in "Something Borrowed, Something Blew Up" (4.13), Brandi leaves Peter at the altar and Mary agrees to break the news to the would-be bridegroom and everyone else.

By the time of "The Anti-Social Network" (5.01), Brandi has moved away from Albuquerque to be with Scott Griffin, with whom she shares many interests. It is also noticed that she has begun drinking heavily. In the series finale, Brandi returns to Albuquerque to live with Mary, and is also pregnant by an unknown man. At the very end of the episode Brandi confirms that she will keep the baby, since Mary kept Norah.

=== Jinx Shannon ===
Jinx Shannon (Lesley Ann Warren) is a recovering alcoholic, and the mother of Mary and Brandi. Her husband James left her and her daughters after robbing a bank. Mary and Brandi both see themselves as being more mature than Jinx, which is true, to a point. She seems to have a strong resentment of her elder daughter, which eventually subsides.

Throughout the first season, Jinx struggles with her alcoholism. She is also unable to keep a job, moving very quickly between jobs such as door-to-door makeup saleswoman and stage actress.

By the second season, Jinx's alcoholism peaks. She is arrested for public intoxication, which she profusely denies. She is ordered by the court to attend AA meetings. However, she refuses to attend one meeting because she has a dentist's appointment and convinces a reluctant Brandi to attend in her place. Later, when confronted with video of her arrest before court, she realizes she is an alcoholic, pleads guilty, and asks to be placed in rehab.

Later, Jinx becomes a dance instructor at a ballet studio, and appears to have become sober. In season 5, Jinx moves to Florida to take care of Brandi, after Brandi has started drinking heavily. In the finale, she and Brandi move back to Albuquerque after the death of Mary and Brandi's father, James Shannon.

=== Stan McQueen ===
Marshal Stan McQueen (Paul Ben-Victor) is the chief inspector for WitSec's Southwest region, and is Mary and Marshall's boss. Diminutive but tough, he is a flexible boss, but tries to stick to the rules as much as possible. He always quickly backs up Mary and Marshall whenever they appear to be in trouble.

Stan works hard to protect his marshals, which leads to constant conflicts with other law-enforcement agencies and, sometimes, even witnesses. He knows Mary, despite her baggage and volatility, is a good marshal and is valuable to the team.

By the second season, Eleanor Prince has been hired as the new Albuquerque office manager. A recent widow, she and Stan fall in love, and have a brief relationship before she takes a job with the FBI. In the final season Stan is promoted to Deputy Director of WITSEC.

=== Raphael Ramirez ===
Raphael Ramirez (Cristián de la Fuente) is a former minor league baseball player for the Albuquerque Isotopes, and is Mary's former fiancé. He is often frustrated with Mary, due to her instinctive reactions and harsh manner. He first appeared in "Pilot" (1.01) and most recently in "Drag Me to Hell" (5.05).

During the first season, Raph and Mary have a strained relationship. However, he has a strong relationship with Mary's sister, Brandi. When Brandi returns from New Jersey with a suitcase full of drugs, he steals them and hides them in the baselines at the baseball stadium, saving the Shannon sisters from certain arrest.

By season two, Raph has been injured and can no longer play baseball. He finds work by appearing in commercials for Peter, which annoys Mary. Raph proposes to Mary, and she eventually accepts. Raph's mother later travels from the Dominican Republic to plan an engagement party, without their consent.

After discovering that Mary and Raph have moved in with each other, Raph's mother refuses to travel to Albuquerque to plan the wedding. However, she sends her sister, Rita (Rita Moreno). While Aunt Rita is there, Raph secretly tells her that he plans on calling off the engagement. Later, he does. He makes one more appearance during the third season, in which he and Mary say goodbye.

Raph appeared once in the fifth season, introducing Mary to his new wife.

=== Robert Dershowitz ===
Detective Robert "Bobby D" Dershowitz (Todd Williams) is a homicide detective for the Albuquerque P.D. He at first has many hostile encounters with Mary, Marshall, and Stan, but, after the events of the first-season finale, seems to get along much better with them. Bobby D first appeared in "Pilot" (1.01) and last appeared in "Don't Cry for Me, Albuquerque" (2.15).

Bobby D was prominent in the nationwide manhunt for Mary, and also a year later when she was shot. He was present at the time of her shooting.

He has since been assigned to a task force in Chicago.

=== Abigail Chaffee ===
Detective Abigail Chaffee (Rachel Boston) is a detective with the Albuquerque PD, and is engaged to Marshall Mann. Abigail is a native Texan who graduated from Southern Methodist University.

She first appeared in "The Art of the Steal" (4.01), in which she was part of an investigation accusing Brandi Shannon of stealing from Peter. Mary showed obvious contempt for her, but the two later somewhat reconciled. Abigail and Marshall began dating, and they became engaged in "The Merry Wives of WITSEC" (5.04). In the series finale, troubled about Mary's tendency to call Marshall whenever she needed him, Abigail told Marshall their wedding plans were on hold until he got some things straight with Mary. Marshall talked to Mary about how much he loved Abigail and wanted a life with her and Mary gave them her blessing. The final montage shows Marshall and Abigail meeting with the minister to plan their wedding.

== Recurring characters ==
=== Peter Alpert ===
Peter Alpert (Joshua Malina) is the owner of a car dealership, owns "half of Albuquerque" (as stated by Mary Shannon), and was engaged to Brandi Shannon. He first appeared in "A Stand-Up Triple" (2.03).

Brandi met Peter at an Alcoholics Anonymous meeting early in season two. He at first despised her, as she was not really an alcoholic, but came to the meeting anyway. However, he later asked her to go on a date with him after she made an enormous effort to apologize to him. When Brandi tried to get him to break up with her, he would not, and said he hoped they could continue to date. She agreed. He is well liked even by Mary, though she doesn't understand why he likes Brandi.

Brandi and Peter continue to date into season three. Their relationship becomes a bit strained when Brandi asks for several thousand dollars, but he gives it to her anyway. By the season finale, "A Priest Walks Into a Bar" (3.13), Brandi has moved in with him. The two announced their engagement in "The Art of the Steal" (4.01). In "Something Borrowed, Something Blew Up" (4.13), Brandi left Peter at the altar, choosing instead to run away.

=== Mike Faber ===
Special Agent Mike Faber (Steven Weber) is an FBI agent who dated Mary. He first appeared in "Whistle Stop" (3.04) and last in "A Priest Walks Into a Bar" (3.13).

Faber first appeared when trying to convince an informant to join WitSec. Mary initially does not like him, but that changes when he tells her about his father. He later reappears in Albuquerque with another witness; he and Mary share drinks and enjoy a short-lived relationship before he must leave Albuquerque. In the season three finale, "A Priest Walks Into a Bar" (3.13), he returns with yet another witness. By the end of the episode, he and Mary have taken a vacation together in Mexico.

=== Shelly Finkel ===
Dr. Shelly Finkel (Ali Marsh) is a psychiatrist originally sent to observe Mary, but appears in later seasons to evaluate and treat witnesses. She first appeared in "In My Humboldt Opinion" (2.02). She briefly develops an infatuation with Marshall but realizes they have no romantic future together. Ali Marsh is the real life wife of Fredrick Weller.

=== Scott Griffin ===
Scott Griffin (Aaron Ashmore) is the half-brother of Mary and Brandi. He first appeared in "Son of Mann" (3.08).

He first appeared when Brandi returned from an extended absence. Scott claims to share the same father as Mary and Brandi. Mary at first is skeptical that he is their half-brother, but eventually recognizes that it is the truth. He repeatedly asks Brandi for money, which he later uses in several gambling schemes. When she finally refuses, he leaves, but later returns claiming to have been mugged. He confesses to Brandi that he was actually beat up by people he owed money to. Brandi feels bad, and gives him the money he had asked for.

By the fifth season, Brandi has moved away from Albuquerque to pursue business ventures with Scott. In "The Medal of Mary" (5.06), Scott is shot and killed by one of his father's partners.

=== Robert O'Conner ===
Special Agent Robert O'Conner (Will McCormack) is an FBI agent who is seemingly obsessed with the Shannon sisters. He has also since shown an interest in their missing father. O'Conner first appeared in "Stan by Me" (1.11).

O'Conner first appeared when Brandi became involved with drug dealers in New Jersey. He was originally based in New Jersey, but moved to Albuquerque to follow the case. He spent many of his resources and much of his time attempting to have Mary and Brandi arrested and charged with drug trafficking and murder. After failing to find drugs at their home (even going so far as to have several walls taken out), he was forced to give up.

He resurfaced in the second season, having Brandi arrested on drug and murder charges and Mary's kidnapping as Brandi communicating with the kidnappers at the time. He attempted to force Brandi into confessing by threatening to have the same charges filed against Mary if she did not co-operate. Mary began investigating O'Conner when she discovered he had originally been assigned to the raid in New Jersey that saw two FBI agents killed, but swapped shifts with another agent shortly beforehand. She discovered O'Conner had been sleeping with one of the dead agent's wives at the time of the raid, and was attempting to prosecute Brandi out of guilt. After proving that Brandi's phone call to her kidnappers had been made at a time when Brandi was in FBI custody - thus making O'Conner a part of the conspiracy or incompetent - Mary had the charges against her sister dropped.

In the final season he returns to Albuquerque, after Mary's father unexpectedly returns. He once again blames one of the Shannons for a crime they did not commit. This time, going after Mary, trying to blame her for conspiring with her father, a known fugitive.

=== Delia Parmalee ===
Delia Parmalee (Tangie Ambrose) is another Inspector at the Albuquerque office. She first appeared in "The Art of the Steal" (4.01). She is always seen as happy, which irks Mary.

=== Eleanor Prince ===
Eleanor Prince (Holly Maples) is the former Albuquerque WitSec office manager, and is currently an FBI analyst. She first appeared in "Gilted Lily" (2.01) and remained with the Albuquerque office until "Don't Cry for Me, Albuquerque" (2.15).

Eleanor relocated to Albuquerque after the death of her husband, John. She frequently encountered friction with Mary, but was treated sympathetically by Marshall. She often was able to contact old sources at the FBI, who would help with various cases. She and Stan enjoyed a brief relationship before she left the Marshal Service to rejoin the FBI.

=== James Shannon ===
James Wiley Shannon (Stephen Lang) is the father of Mary and Brandi. For the majority of the series, he was on the run from law enforcement, having robbed a bank. Until the fifth season, he was unseen, though often mentioned. He first appeared in "Drag Me to Hell" (5.05).

In the second season, the Shannon women discover that James had started a new family after leaving them; his daughter, Lauren, visited the Shannons to reveal James's actions. In the third season, it is revealed James has a son, Scott.

In "Drag Me to Hell", James appears at Mary's door. Mary immediately arrests him. Over the next few days/weeks he escapes, and is again arrested by Mary. After this second arrest, he is shot by a business partner after diving in front of Mary, to protect her from being shot. He dies from his wounds, is later cremated, and Mary spreads his ashes on a horse racing track, since going to a racetrack with him is the earliest memory Mary had of her father.

== Minor characters ==
The following are characters appearing in multiple episodes in small roles. A number of McCormack's ex-castmates on The West Wing have appeared; in addition to recurring cast member Joshua Malina, three actors, Allison Janney, Richard Schiff, and Bradley Whitford, have appeared.

- Neil "Spanky" Carson (Mark Boone Junior) was a drug dealer working in New Jersey. He was arrested after becoming involved with Chuck and Brandi and killing two FBI agents. He first appeared in "Stan by Me" (1.11) and last appeared in "A Fine Meth" (1.12).
- Charlie Connor (Keith Nobbs) is a young inspector with the Albuquerque WitSec. He is usually just a "paper-pusher," but is given a much bigger role when a tip comes in about a wanted fugitive. He first appeared in "Whistle Stop" (3.04) and has most recently appeared in "The Born Identity" (3.11).
- Lia Hernandez (Tia Carrere) is a dance instructor who is dating Stan. In "Four Marshals and a Baby" (5.02), Stan takes her dance class and confesses his affection for her. By "The Merry Wives of WITSEC" (5.04), Marshall discovers that the two are dating.
- Chuck Johnson (Tim Kelleher) is Brandi's ex-boyfriend, who was implicated in the murder of two FBI agents and a drug trafficking ring. He first appeared in "Stan by Me" (1.11) and last appeared in "Who's Bugging Mary?" (2.09).
- Rachel Miller (Jenny Gabrielle) is a meth addict who was implicated in a drug trafficking ring led by Spanky and Chuck. She had a baby who was taken away from her by child services after it was found by Brandi alone in a bathtub. She first appeared in "To Serge with Love" (1.10) and last appeared in "A Fine Meth" (1.12).
- Allison Pearson (Allison Janney) is the Presidentially-appointed United States Marshal for the Albuquerque district in the Marshals Service. Mary initially disrespects her, but Allison won't stand for it. After Stan apologizes for Mary, she allows the branch to retain their funds. She first appeared in "When Mary Met Marshall" (3.02) and later in "Coma Chameleon" (3.03).
- Theresa Simmons (Erika Alexander) is a financial officer within the Albuquerque branch. She believes in strict professionalism, and never jokes on the job. She first appeared in "Fish or Cut Betta" (3.05) and most recently in "The Born Identity" (3.11).
- Mark Stuber (Bryan Callen) is Mary's ex-husband, to whom she was married before the series began. He first appeared in "Second Crime Around" (4.05), in which he and Mary slept together. He is the father of Norah, Mary's daughter.
- Tasha Turischeva / Tasha Somova (Angela Sarafyan) is one of Mary's witnesses and a Ukrainian accountant. She briefly dated a fellow witness, which led to great trouble. She first appeared in the pilot episode and later in "To Serge with Love" (1.10).
