= A Priest Walks Into a Bar =

- In Plain Sight episode
- Episode no.: Season 3 Episode 13
- Directed by: Michael Morris
- Written by: John Cockrell
- Production code: 3_313
- Original air date: June 30, 2010

Guest appearances
- Nicole Greenwood as Linda Ivey; Inbar Lavi as Flora Montero; King Orba as Isko; Special Guest Starring: Joe Spano as Father Gabriel Adams; Steven Weber as FBI Agent Michael Faber

Episode chronology
← Previous "WitSec Stepmother"	Next → "The Art of the Steal"

"A Priest Walks Into a Bar" is the third-season finale episode of In Plain Sight and the 40th episode overall. It originally aired June 30, 2010 on USA Network.

== Summary ==
When an argument between two sex traffickers leads to a gunfight and her death outside a stripper's dressing room Gabriel Andrews (Joe Spano) and her friend witness the event. After his relocation to New Mexico Gabe rejects his faith and eagerly accepts his new role as a bartender. While visiting him at work to give him some mail that has been received via the Witsec program Mary sees his reaction to one of the letters and remains concerned. She goes to visit him at home and finds that he is in contact with someone from his previous life. He confesses that it is the friend of the dead girl and that she is not known to the authorities as a witness as he wanted to keep her out of trouble. Mary returns the next day and finds that Andrews has gone to meet the girl in Flagstaff, realises the danger that Andrews is in and goes to try to stop him. Marshall and Mary manage to stop the gunmen who were following the girl and Andrews gives the last rites to one of them as he lays dying.

At the end of the episode Andrews testifies and Marshall gives a speech to Mary about how she needs someone in her life that challenges her intellect and is not intimidated by her personality but she is distracted and Marshall left on his own. Andrews joins a parish in Las Vegas with his re-found faith. Mary spends her vacation days with FBI Agent Faber (Steven Weber) at a top class hotel in Mexico and the two share a kiss in the closing scene of the episode.

== Reception ==
In its original USA Network broadcast (June 30, 2010), "A Priest Walks Into a Bar" was viewed by an estimated 3.85 million households with a 0.9 rating/3% share in the 18–49 demographic.

Darren Franich of Entertainment Weekly gave the episode a positive review saying, "The WITSEC plotline was fun: a priest witnesses a murder, suffers a minor-key crisis of faith, chats with agnostic Mary about faith and belief and all that jam. (As part of his new identity, the priest worked as a bartender. This led Mary to joke that he used to offer absolution, and now he offers Absolut. Hey, Mary McCormack made it sound funny.)"

Franich went on to say, "Of course, the real fun came in the last few minutes of the episode: romantic yearning, a kiss, and a tropical sunset..." adding "Mary ended up on vacay in a lavish Mexican hotel room, flirting with the man-candy room service. But twist twist bang bang!! Man-candy left, the bathroom door opened, and out stepped Steven Weber, going full doucheboat as Agent Mike Faber. “God you’re an idiot,” said Mary smoochingly. “Oh, shut up,” answered Mike kissfully. “No, you shut up,” argued Mary liptastically. And scene!" (Doucheboat is a term coined by Entertainment weekly and refers to the combination of the words "douche" and dreamboat.)

== Cast ==
- Mary McCormack as Marshal Mary Shannon
- Fred Weller as Marshal Marshall Mann
- Paul Ben-Victor as Chief Stan McQueen

=== Supporting cast ===
- Nichole Hiltz as Brandi Shannon
- Lesley Ann Warren as Jinx Shannon
- Joshua Malina as Peter Alpert
