= List of In Plain Sight episodes =

In Plain Sight is a USA Network drama created by David Maples. Starring Mary McCormack, the series follows Mary Shannon, a Deputy United States Marshal who works at the Albuquerque, New Mexico office of the Federal Witness Security Program (WITSEC). The series premiered on Sunday, June 1, 2008, and aired its 61st and final episode on May 4, 2012.

== Series overview ==
Season	Episodes	Originally released	
Season	Episodes	First released	Last released
1	12	June 1, 2008	August 17, 2008
2	15	April 19, 2009	August 9, 2009
3	13	March 31, 2010	June 30, 2010
4	13	May 1, 2011	August 7, 2011
5	8	March 16, 2012	May 4, 2012

== Episodes ==
=== Season 1 (2008) ===
No. overall	No. in season	Title	Directed by	Written by	Original release date	US viewers (millions)
1	1	"Pilot"	Mark Piznarski	David Maples	June 1, 2008	5.25
Mary and Marshall are on their way to drop off a new Ukrainian witness (Angela Sarafyan) when Stan calls them about the murder of the son of two of Mary's witnesses (Al Sapienza and Kathrine Narducci). Meanwhile, Mary's sister Brandi visits from New Jersey.
2	2	"Hoosier Daddy"	John Fortenberry	David Maples	June 8, 2008	4.39
Things get complicated when Mary takes on the case of a child who saw his mother murdered and is going to testify against the people who killed her, including his father (Vincent Ventresca).
3	3	"Never the Bride"	John T. Kretchmer	David Maples	June 15, 2008	4.07
Mary's assignment is a serial con-artist (Missi Pyle) who is married to a diamond smuggler. While Mary is trying to keep her safe, the witness gets engaged and her photo is all over the papers.
4	4	"Trojan Horst"	Bryan Spicer	Constance M. Burge	June 22, 2008	4.67
Mary and Marshall take on a case involving a man (Dave Foley) who works for an assassin-for-hire. While trying to line up her next job, the man is busted and agrees to testify against her to become a part of the Witness Protection Program.
5	5	"Who Shot Jay Arnstein?"	Tricia Brock	Matt Ward	June 29, 2008	4.46
When Jay Arnstein (John Ales) is put into the witness protection program, he brings both his wife (Sherry Stringfield) and his mistress (Virginia Williams). While this doesn't set well with Mary, she must keep the arrangement a secret. After Jay is shot, all the secrets start to come out.
6	6	"High Priced Spread"	Fred Gerber	Matt Ward	July 6, 2008	4.58
Two brothers are assigned to Mary, one of whom develops a gambling addiction.
7	7	"Iris Doesn't Live Here Anymore"	Sam Weisman	Linda Burstyn	July 13, 2008	5.09
The closeness of a family is tested when they enter the program after the daughter (Jontille Gerard) witnesses a shooting.
8	8	"Don of the Dead"	John Showalter	Story by : Jessica Butler & Brynn Malone; Teleplay by : Brynn Malone	July 20, 2008	4.69
A member of the Program (John Benjamin Hickey) under Mary's watch is in a car accident and Mary has to find out if it was an accident or related to his former life.
9	9	"Good Cop, Dead Cop"	Dan Lerner	Story by : David Maples; Teleplay by : Bruce Miller	July 27, 2008	4.17
A Chicago cop (Jason Wiles) testifies against his corrupt colleagues.
10	10	"To Serge with Love"	Rod Hardy	Katherine Butler	August 3, 2008	4.22
The life of Mary's Ukrainian witness (Angela Sarafyan) - who we first met in the Pilot episode - becomes more complicated when she discovers that her new boyfriend (Alex Feldman) is also in WITSEC. Mary's sister Brandi meets with a potential buyer for her, and Chuck's, drug stash. Brandi gives her teddy bear to someone who needs it more than she does.
11	11	"Stan by Me"	Jesus Trevino	Story by : Constance M. Burge; Teleplay by : Constance M. Burge & Brynn Malone	August 10, 2008	4.18
In New Jersey, Brandi's dealer boyfriend Chuck (Tim Kelleher) is arrested by two FBI agents. He immediately offers everything he knows in return for witness protection. Just as his offer is accepted by the DOJ chain of command, masked men invade the house, slay the two agents and abduct Chuck. In Albuquerque, Mary accidentally discovers that Jinx is auditioning for a musical. After enduring a bewildering harangue from Jinx, Mary leaves the theatre, then she too is assaulted and abducted. When a by-the-book FBI agent, Robert O’Conner (Will McCormack), makes the connection between the two crimes, a multi-agency manhunt begins for Mary, Chuck and their kidnappers - the ruthless Spanky (Mark Boone Junior) and his crew.
12	12	"A Fine Meth"	John Badham	David Maples	August 17, 2008	3.78
A traumatised Mary returns home to learn that Brandi's involvement with Chuck may result in her losing her career with the Marshal’s Service. Stan and Marshall search for a way to persuade Spanky to come clean about Chuck's drug trafficking and thereby clear the Shannon sisters' names. Rachel, the tweaker woman who Brandi met at the Motel in episode 10, positively identifies Brandi for FBI agent O’Conner. Mary, Jinx and Brandi have a very emotional family meeting in which long held secrets emerge. Stan and Marshall have a breakthrough that involves the new owner of a certain teddy bear. A clueless Raph turns up drunk, at Mary’s house. And the FBI prepare to drop the hammer on the Shannon household…

=== Season 2 (2009) ===
No. overall	No. in season	Title	Directed by	Written by	Original release date	US viewers (millions)
13	1	"Gilted Lily"	Stephen Hopkins	David Maples	April 19, 2009	5.11
Mary helps to protect three siblings (Will Estes, Ellen Hollman, and Liza Weil) after their mother, one of her witnesses, is found dead in her house. A dead witness causes Mary to take ditch her administrative leave to solve the case, until her plan gets changed by her own brand of post-traumatic stress disorder.
14	2	"In My Humboldt Opinion"	Dan Lerner	David Maples	April 26, 2009	3.97
A northern California marijuana mastermind (Kevin Rankin) cannot testify without using the drug to neutralize his anxiety disorder, leading him to fake amnesia to get out of his court date. Mary is observed by a psychiatrist (Ali Marsh) to determine her readiness for active duty. Meanwhile, Jinx show up in the emergency room and under arrest for drunk driving.
15	3	"A Stand-Up Triple"	Sam Weisman	Michael Angeli	May 3, 2009	3.67
An irresponsible mother of three (Cynthia Watros) is reluctant to play by the rules. When the eldest boy (Jesse James) begins ditching school, Mary must deal with his behavior and soon discovers what's really behind it. Jinx's court date approaches, but she still believes she did nothing wrong. Brandi agrees to attend an Alcoholics Anonymous meeting as Jinx and meets a new man (Joshua Malina). After watching the video of her arrest, Jinx breaks down, and pleads guilty when she arrives at court.
16	4	"Rubble With A Cause"	Michael Watkins	Alexander Cary	May 10, 2009	3.60
When a mercenary (Matthew Davis) is trapped in a collapsed building, Mary must keep him alive while guarding him from his former Mexico City partner (David Zayas), who may be targeting him from a nearby building. On the ground, Stan and Marshall must fend off a determined reporter (Mandy June Turpin) who may expose the man's real identity, further endangering his life. Brandi tries to make amends after admitting to Peter (Joshua Malina) that she pretended to be Jinx.
17	5	"Aguna Matatala"	Leslie Libman	David Slack	May 17, 2009	3.95
An Orthodox Jew (Jeremy Glazer) enters the program, but his wife (Sarah Drew), who was shocked by his illegal conduct, refuses witness protection and seeks a divorce. A rabbi (Richard Schiff) who wants the resistant husband to sign divorce papers, annoys Mary with his persistence. To resolve the situation Mary must find a way to make everyone happy. Meanwhile, Jinx returns home from rehab and Brandi is asked out on a date by Peter (Joshua Malina).
18	6	"One Night Stan"	Dan Lerner	John Mankiewicz	May 31, 2009	4.04
Stan's first witness from 1988 turns up buried in the desert, and his suspicious reluctance to help the Albuquerque police leads to him becoming the lead suspect. Mary and Marshall's investigation of the case uncovers a story of Stan's rookie mistakes, a cover-up, and a love triangle.
19	7	"Duplicate Bridge"	Bryan Spicer	Lynne E. Litt	June 7, 2009	3.73
Marshall's witness (Clarke Peters), the architect of a bridge that collapsed, appears to have committed suicide. However Marshall is convinced that he faked his suicide and has a plan to get justice against the man he testified against - the boss of the bridge's construction company (Chris Mulkey). Marshall and Mary set out to find him before he carries out his plan. Meanwhile, Brandi asks for Mary's input on her English class assignment.
20	8	"A Frond in Need"	Ernest Dickerson	Brynn Malone	June 14, 2009	4.27
Mary and Marshall investigate a new witness (Todd Louiso) whom they suspect may be responsible for a number of murders and the stabbing of one of Mary's friends (Joseph D. Reitman). Meanwhile, a surprise visitor (Laura Prepon) visits Jinx and Brandi with among other things, a letter from James Shannon.
21	9	"Who's Bugging Mary?"	Bethany Rooney	Jessica Butler	June 21, 2009	3.72
Agent O'Connor (Will McCormack) resurfaces to arrest Brandi for drug trafficking and murder. Mary is determined to uncover O'Connor's real motive for pursuing a case against Brandi.
22	10	"Miles to Go"	Sam Weisman	David Graziano	June 28, 2009	N/A
A new witness (David Denman) demands visitation rights with his son as part of his testimony deal, but when Mary tries to locate the missing boy, Mary and Marshall must do some digging to find the missing link. Dr. Shelly Finkel is called in for assistance and has eyes for Marshall. Brandi helps an ailing homeless man to the emergency room.
23	11	"Jailbait"	Michael Watkins	Lynne E. Litt & Alexander Cary	July 12, 2009	3.91
The teen daughter (Francia Raisa) of Mary's witness (Carlos Gómez) reveals to be in a reckless romance with the son of the man her father's testifying against. Elsewhere, Raphael's mother (Carmen Serano) visits Mary and starts planning her engagement party without knowing that Mary and Raph aren't engaged.
24	12	"Training Video"	Dan Lerner	Brynn Malone	July 19, 2009	3.92
Mary lends her expertise to the new Witness Protection Advisors training video. Marshall prepares the arrangements for an elderly mobster (Martin Landau) in WITSEC to go to his son's funeral.
25	13	"Let's Get it Ahn"	Felix Alcala	David Maples	July 26, 2009	4.16
A counterfeiter witness (Sherilyn Fenn) is implicated in a murder. Mary and Marshall feel the clues make no sense, and wonder if there is a conspiracy at hand.
26	14	"Once a Ponzi Time"	Dan Lerner	Alexander Cary & John Mankiewicz	August 2, 2009	3.88
After revealing his bosses' fraud, a Wall Street investor (James Frain) goes into WITSEC. He gives away his family fortune to gain protection, which becomes inconvenient when a ransom from his past needs to be paid.
27	15	"Don't Cry for Me, Albuquerque"	Michael Morris	Jessica Butler	August 9, 2009	4.44
The US government helps a Latin American political activist (Angélica Castro) hide in WITSEC, but the arrangement sours after she moves into her new home in a rough neighborhood and puts everyone in danger.

=== Season 3 (2010) ===
In Plain Sight's third-season premiere was Wednesday, March 31, 2010, on USA. Lesley Ann Warren, Cristian de la Fuente, and Joshua Malina, appeared as recurring characters. Allison Janney joined the cast in a two-episode story arc as Allison Pearson, the new US Marshal Service regional director.

Originally slated for a 16-episode season, USA Network reduced In Plain Sight's episode order to 13 when executive producer and showrunner, John McNamara was forced to take a leave of absence for medical reasons.

No. overall	No. in season	Title	Directed by	Written by	Original release date	US viewers (millions)
28	1	"Father Goes West"	Charles Haid	John McNamara	March 31, 2010	3.81
After being discharged from the hospital with a fresh bullet wound scar, Mary gets right back to work, investigating the possibility that one of her witnesses (Donnie Wahlberg) has resumed his life of crime. Meanwhile, Marshall sets out to discover the identity of Mary's shooter (Luis Moncada).
29	2	"When Mary Met Marshall"	Fred Gerber	Brynn Malone	April 7, 2010	3.33
A break-in threatens the security of the first witnesses (Josh Cooke and Jeannine Kaspar) Mary and Marshall handled together, prompting flashbacks to the way Mary joined WITSEC. Meanwhile, a new WITSEC executive, Allison Pearson (Allison Janney), visits the Albuquerque office.
30	3	"Coma Chameleon"	Michael Watkins	Kim Newton	April 14, 2010	3.15
ATF Agent Wade Guthrie (Mike Doyle) wakes up after a three-year coma and discovers he's been placed in witness protection under Mary's care. Meanwhile, Raphael's Aunt Rita (Rita Moreno) arrives to discuss Mary and Raph's wedding, and Regional Director Pearson (Allison Janney) continues to observe the office.
31	4	"Whistle Stop"	Michael Zinberg	Lynne E. Litt	April 21, 2010	3.41
Mary and Marshall try to help FBI Agent Mike Faber (Steven Weber) convince his informant (Geoffrey Blake) to enter WITSEC. Despite their best efforts, the informant refuses their protection and gets himself into a heap of trouble. Meanwhile, Stan has to deal with an ex-boxer/witness (Chad L. Coleman) suffering from pugilistic dementia.
32	5	"Fish or Cut Betta"	Dan Lerner	Dailyn Rodriguez	April 28, 2010	3.27
When Dominic (Louis Lombardi), a sociopathic former hit man with a love of explosives, falls in love for the first time, Mary fears that he won't handle rejection very well. Meanwhile, the WitSec office welcomes a new financial manager, and Mary says her goodbyes to Raphael.
33	6	"No Clemency for Old Men"	Jerry Levine	Jim D. Gray	May 5, 2010	3.26
When a hardened bank robber (Fred Ward) who's been in prison for decades is finally paroled, it falls to Mary to help him acclimate to life on the outside and keep him from falling back into a life of crime. Meanwhile, when one of Mary's other witnesses (Brooke Bloom) no longer wants to work with her, Marshall steps in to help out – only to find himself in a predicament when the witness prefers him to Mary.
34	7	"Love's Faber Lost"	Deran Sarafian	Lynne E. Litt	May 12, 2010	N/A
Faber (Steven Weber) returns to Mary's life when he gives her a new witness: Natalie (Alexandra Lydon), a key witness and co-conspirator in a nationwide mortgage fraud scheme which was operated by major gangs to raise millions for drugs and weapons.
35	8	"Son of Mann"	Anton Cropper	Brynn Malone	May 19, 2010	2.87
Seth Mann (Geoff Pierson), a legendary Marshal whose career spans decades and who also happens to be Marshall's father, comes to Albuquerque to work on Operation Falcon, a nationwide sweep of open warrants. Meanwhile, Brandi returns to Albuquerque with a suspicious story about her disappearance and a surprise guest (Aaron Ashmore) connected to her past.
36	9	"Death Becomes Her"	Bethany Rooney	Kim Newton	June 2, 2010	3.48
A woman (Laura San Giacomo) from an organized crime family experiences a major health scare (which proves terminal) and witnesses her beloved niece repeating all of her mistakes. After she becomes vocal about her disapproval of her family's life, her cousin (Michael Badalucco) tries to kill her but she kills him instead. She decides to take action and turn to the Feds. One problem: she has a secret that puts her status in Witness Protection in jeopardy, so she turns to the one person who can help — her new friend Mary Shannon.
37	10	"Her Days Are Numbered"	Dan Lerner	Story by : Gene O'Neill & Noreen Tobin; Teleplay by : Matthew J. Lieberman & Dailyn Rodriguez	June 9, 2010	3.61
A witness with Asperger's Syndrome (Karina Logue) who has no social filter and can't lie confounds Mary, particularly when the witness refuses to testify against her only 'friend'; the key conspirator in a numbers case. Meanwhile Marshall and Stan manage to keep a witness whose temporary visa is to expire after she had testified at trial. She gets investigated by ICE after she steals medical supplies to cure patients in her home country.
38	11	"The Born Identity"	Bryan Spicer	Brynn Malone & Kim Newton	June 16, 2010	4.14
Mary's newest witness is a homeless man (Esteban Powell) who exposed a pipe bomb plot. As he struggles to conform to the rules of WITSEC, Mary agrees to help him search for his birth parents; which presents unexpected problems when they are found. Also, Stan and new office recruit Charlie (Keith Nobbs) get a tip from a talkative witness (Matt Winston) to bust a most-wanted fugitive. Meanwhile, Brandi becomes distrustful of Scott (Aaron Ashmore) who once again needs money, which leads her to take some financial advice from Peter (Joshua Malina).
39	12	"Witsec Stepmother"	Tawnia McKiernan	Matthew J. Lieberman & Dailyn Rodriguez	June 23, 2010	3.64
Mary plays ‘stepmother’ to a rebellious 16-year-old witness (Spencer Locke) of a jewelry heist whose separated parents are too self-involved to deal with their teenaged daughter's issues. Meanwhile, Marshall suspects that a witness was sold out while at a family reunion. Brandi takes care of Scott (Aaron Ashmore) after he is assaulted under mysterious circumstances.
40	13	"A Priest Walks Into a Bar"	Michael Morris	John Cockrell	June 30, 2010	3.85
A priest (Joe Spano) witnesses the murder of a stripper, but does not want to cut ties with the victim's family. Meanwhile, Stan must tell the daughter of a deceased witness about her father's past, Brandi decides to move in with Peter (Joshua Malina), and Mary begins a relationship with Faber (Steven Weber).

=== Season 4 (2011) ===
In Plain Sight was renewed for a fourth and fifth season by USA Network on July 28, 2010. The fourth season of thirteen episodes began on May 1, 2011. Rachel Boston joined the cast as Det. Abigail Chaffee, Marshall's new girlfriend, and Joshua Malina continued to portray Peter Alpert on a recurring basis. Additional guests included Bradley Whitford, John de Lancie, and Ali Marsh. The season began production in January 2011, and continued until June 2011 in Albuquerque, New Mexico. The season also saw the pregnancy of lead character Mary Shannon, to incorporate the real life pregnancy of star Mary McCormack.

No. overall	No. in season	Title	Directed by	Written by	Original release date	US viewers (millions)
41	1	"The Art of the Steal"	Dan Lerner	Ed Decter	May 1, 2011	3.87
Mary and Marshall consult with a thief in order to catch another thief in order to clear Brandi's name. Meanwhile, Marshall begins dating a detective (Rachel Boston), Peter's (Joshua Malina) parents (Ken Lerner and Randee Heller) try to force Brandi to sign a pre-nup, and a new WITSEC inspector (Tangie Ambrose) joins the Albuquerque office.
42	2	"Crazy Like a Witness"	Matthew Penn	Barry Schkolnick	May 8, 2011	3.16
Mary attempts to help a witness (Bradley Whitford) bond with his son while dealing with his extreme paranoia.
43	3	"Love in the Time of Colorado"	Michael Schultz	John Cockrell	May 15, 2011	3.18
Mary finds herself in a modern Romeo and Juliet when she helps a witness (John Asher) who is in love with a suspect (Dahlia Salem). Meanwhile, Shelly Finkle (Ali Marsh) returns to Albuquerque and holds Marshall captive.
44	4	"Meet the Shannons"	Jan Eliasberg	Brynn Malone	May 22, 2011	2.62
A teenage beauty queen (Meredith Hagner) suddenly realizes that she has spent her entire life in witness protection, and needs Mary's help to cope. Meanwhile, Brandi and Jinx con Peter's (Joshua Malina) parents (Ken Lerner and Randee Heller) into hosting the wedding.
45	5	"Second Crime Around"	Andy Wolk	Mike Weiss	June 5, 2011	3.45
Despite her protests, Mary is forced to team up with an unapologetic witness (Maury Sterling) to take down an even bigger criminal (D.W. Moffett). Meanwhile, Mary's ex-husband Mark (Bryan Callen) visits Albuquerque and she reluctantly agrees to have dinner with him, after which they have a one-night stand. Marshall decides to move in with Abigail (Rachel Boston) in order to increase their chances of having a good relationship.
46	6	"Something A-mish"	Dan Lerner	Barry Schkolnick	June 12, 2011	3.99
When an Amish couple (Ashley Johnson and Billy Magnussen) enters the program, Mary must help them adapt to their new lives. Mary notices some changes in her life, leading her to eventually realize that she is pregnant with Mark's child.
47	7	"I'm a Liver Not a Fighter"	Michael Watkins	Michael Reisz	June 19, 2011	3.28
A dying witness (Gordon Clapp) wants to reconcile with his children (Teddy Sears and Marguerite Moreau). After complications requiring that the witness be given a liver, his estranged son agrees to donate part of his. Brandi, meanwhile, continues planning her wedding, asking for Mary for photos of their father.
48	8	"Kumar vs. Kumar"	Michael Fields	Rupa Magge	June 26, 2011	3.60
An Indian couple (Cas Anvar and Sarayu Rao) under witness protection ask for a divorce, forcing Mary to mediate the proceedings. The situation takes an even uglier turn when Marshall is called to the couple's home by their child, where he discovers hidden drugs. Mary's pregnancy raises some concerns from Stan, who urges her to take medical leave. Meanwhile, Mary avoids Brandi so as to not reveal her pregnancy to her family, though her efforts are not successful for very long.
49	9	"The Rolling Stones"	David Warren	Story by : Barbara Nance; Teleplay by : Sarah Wise	July 10, 2011	3.35
After a criminal (Chris Ellis) mistakes a man (David Norona) for the man's younger brother (Ramses Jimenez), both must enter witness protection. The brothers bicker constantly, with their fighting quickly escalating to illegal activity. Brandi visits Mary and offers to adopt her child, then Brandi and Jinx repeat the offer plus additional support from Jinx. Mary and Marshall help the brothers sort out their difficulties. Mary sees the first ultrasound photos of her baby.
50	10	"Girls, Interrupted"	Lee Rose	Natalie Chaidez	July 17, 2011	3.71
A rockstar (Elizabeth Nicole) witnesses a murder, and she is subsequently placed in witness protection with her mother (Holly Martin Baker). The girl soon asks for emancipation from her mother, who she claims is an alcoholic. The situation worsens when a video of the witness singing is discovered online. Mary visits an adoption agency, where an adoption counselor (Patricia Belcher) gives her a list of prospective parents. Stan orders Mary to avoid any dangerous situations, and she is assigned by Marshall to pay a visit to one of his witnesses.
51	11	"Provo-cation"	Bryan Spicer	Barbara Nance	July 24, 2011	3.34
Two soldiers witness the sale of weapons by a U.S. Army major to Taliban militants, and one of the soldiers is killed in the crossfire. The other joins witness protection along with his wife. Another officer (Joel Gretsch) arrives in Albuquerque, attempting to take over the relocation proceedings. At Mary's strong objections, Stan orders Mary and Marshall to work jointly with the officer. After the witness begins suffering from post-traumatic stress disorder, the situation worsens.
52	12	"A Womb With a View"	Bethany Rooney	Natalie Chaidez	July 31, 2011	3.94
Mary helps a pregnant witness (Kelly Overton) while trying to make a decision about her own child's future. Meanwhile, Brandi prepares for her rehearsal dinner.
53	13	"Something Borrowed, Something Blew Up"	Michael Morris	Mike Weiss	August 7, 2011	4.09
With Brandi's wedding to Peter (Joshua Malina) quickly approaching, Mary and Marshall are forced to protect a witness (Maury Sterling). After the marshals discover the body of a juror, they are ambushed by gunmen and are subsequently trapped without communication. With tensions rising, the marshals battle the four gunmen, capturing one and killing the other three. Before the wedding, Mark (Bryan Callen) attempts to console Brandi, who becomes very nervous. As Mary arrives at the wedding, she meets Brandi leaving, who is abandoning Peter. The wedding is canceled, and Mary goes into labor.

=== Season 5 (2012) ===
In Plain Sight was renewed for its fourth and fifth seasons simultaneously on July 28, 2010. On August 11, 2011, USA confirmed that season five, with just eight episodes, would be its last. It premiered on March 16, 2012. Rachel Boston (Detective Abigail Chaffee) continues, now as a main cast member; Lesley Ann Warren (Jinx Shannon) and Tangie Ambrose (Delia Parmalee) returned as recurring guest stars, while Nichole Hiltz (Brandi Shannon) is expected to return as well. Ali Marsh made multiple appearances as Dr. Shelly Finkel, a psychiatrist working with the inspectors. Bryan Callen returned to the series in multiple episodes as Mark Stuber, the father of Mary's daughter; Mimi Kennedy appeared in several episodes as Mark's mother, Joanna Stuber. The second episode featured Mädchen Amick as Lisa Ruffino, WITSEC's second-in-command who informs Stan that the Albuquerque division of WITSEC will be shut down. Tia Carrere appeared in several episodes as Lia Hernandez, Stan's dance instructor, and later, a love interest. Stephen Lang appeared in multiple episodes as Mary and Brandi's father, James Wiley Shannon. Josh Hopkins appeared in two episodes as Kenny, another single parent who is a potential love interest for Mary. Cristián de la Fuente reprised his role as Raphael Ramirez in one episode, while Vanessa Evigan appeared as his new wife. Aaron Ashmore and Will McCormack returned in the sixth episode as Scott Griffin and Special Agent Robert O'Connor, respectively. It was announced via Twitter that Geoff Pierson would return to the series as Seth Mann, Marshall's father, who visits Albuquerque to speak with Marshall about Abigail; this appearance also came in the sixth episode.

No. overall	No. in season	Title	Directed by	Written by	Original release date	US viewers (millions)
54	1	"The Anti-Social Network"	Dan Lerner	Natalie Chaidez	March 16, 2012	4.01
WITSEC works with a witness to infiltrate a secret society. Mary returns to the office to find that things have changed.
55	2	"Four Marshals and a Baby"	Andy Wolk	Story by : Michael Reisz; Teleplay by : Gina Gold & Aurorae Khoo	March 23, 2012	3.76
A murder is witnessed by a chronic hoarder, and Mary must balance the case and her maternal duties.
56	3	"Reservations, I've Got a Few"	Dan Lerner	Mike Weiss	March 30, 2012	2.63
A Native American aids the inspectors after Marshall's witness goes missing.
57	4	"The Merry Wives of WITSEC"	Michael Fields	Natalie Chaidez	April 6, 2012	2.96
A pharmaceutical salesman (Brady Smith) enters WITSEC to hide from a former client, and Mary and Marshall soon discover that he is hiding a secret family. After the two families discover each other, someone tries to reveal their location by making a call to the client. Meanwhile, Marshall plans a special anniversary with Abigail and Mary is surprised by a visit from Mark's mother.
58	5	"Drag Me to Hell"	Bethany Rooney	Michael Reisz	April 13, 2012	3.59
Mary tries to protect a drag queen while Marshall goes undercover on a sting operation. While working on the case, Mary discovers that Marshall is engaged, and Raphael (Cristián de la Fuente) returns to Albuquerque, bringing his new wife (Vanessa Lee Evigan) with him.
59	6	"The Medal of Mary"	Dan Lerner	Story by : John Cockrell & Ed Decter; Teleplay by : John Cockrell	April 20, 2012	3.27
Brandi and Jinx are put in danger when Mary's father (Stephen Lang) returns, bringing with him the threat that his old partners might resurface. Agent O'Connor (Will McCormack) returns to assist with the case, which opens old wounds between him and Mary. Brandi, Jinx, and Scott (Aaron Ashmore) are taken into protective custody in Florida. Throughout the case, Marshall attempts to spend time with Abigail and his father (Geoff Pierson).
60	7	"Sacrificial Lam"	Michael Watkins	Mike Weiss	April 27, 2012	3.01
Mary must clear her name by finding her father. However, to do so, she must lose her FBI tail.
61	8	"All's Well That Ends"	Dan Lerner	Story by : William Fredrick; Teleplay by : John Cockrell & Mary McCormack and William Fredrick	May 4, 2012	3.20
Mary must juggle a surprise family reunion and her job. Meanwhile, the Albuquerque office goes through some changes.
