= Tilt (American TV series) =

2005 American drama TV series

- Genre: Drama
- Created by: Brian Koppelman; David Levien
- Starring: Chris Bauer; Eddie Cibrian; Kristin Lehman; Todd Williams; Michael Madsen; Michael Murphy
- Composer: Lou Natale
- Country of origin: United States
- Original language: English
- No. of seasons: 1
- No. of episodes: 9

Production
- Running time: 60 minutes (with commercials)
- Production companies: Koppelman/Levien; Orly Adelson Productions; Whizbang Films

Original release
- Network: ESPN
- Release: January 13 – March 13, 2005

Tilt is an American drama television series set against the backdrop of the (fictional) World Championship of Poker tournament in Las Vegas, and with the tagline "You're playing poker. They're playing you." The series first aired on January 13, 2005, and is the second original drama series from ESPN, following Playmakers. It was created by Brian Koppelman and David Levien, who co-wrote the poker-themed feature film Rounders.

The series title refers to being "on tilt", which is poker jargon for letting frustration or other emotional stress interfere with one's poker-playing judgment. While that term is applicable to any form of poker, only one form of the game—no-limit Texas hold'em—is featured in the series. This was presumably meant to capitalize on the growing popularity of no-limit hold'em in the mid-2000s (decade), which was due in part to ESPN's own coverage of the annual World Series of Poker (WSOP), the event upon which the "World Championship of Poker" (WCOP) depicted in Tilt is presumably based.

Tilt is a nine-episode mini-series and was not renewed beyond that. A DVD set of the entire nine-episode run of the series was released on June 14, 2005, about three months after "The Last Hand" ran on ESPN.

== Plot ==
Most of the series takes place within the confines of the fictitious Colorado Casino in Las Vegas. There, a group of professional poker players has banded together to take down legendary gambler Don "The Matador" Everest (Michael Madsen) in a cash game. Each player has his own reason for wanting to hurt Everest, including a cop, Lee Nickel (Chris Bauer), who wants to see him in prison for killing Nickel's brother.

Everest, as it turns out, is a sophisticated poker cheat. His preferred cheating method is collusion with hired partners (Everest calls them his "horses") at the same table, who signal their hole cards to Everest by flashing subtle hand signs. Toward the end of the series, during the "World Championship of Poker" tournament, Everest's horses also help him advance in the tournament by accumulating chips during their own play, then "dumping" them to Everest by intentionally losing to him and passing them during breaks. Everest runs his cheating racket in much the same manner as a Mafia boss, treating his loyal partners lavishly but also coming down brutally on those who violate his trust (up to and including murder, thus giving his "Matador" nickname a whole new literal meaning), and bribing Colorado Casino officials and even local law enforcement to turn a blind eye toward his illegal activities.

One member of the group arrayed against Everest, Eddie Towne (Eddie Cibrian), manages to gain the Matador's trust and is offered a role as one of his horses. This enables Towne to learn firsthand how Everest operates, and eventually to set up a high-stakes game involving himself, his partners and Everest, in which he and his partners plan to use the Matador's own signaling system against him. Unfortunately for them, they learn the hard way that Everest was onto them from the beginning. Towne is brutally cast out of Everest's stable, and his partners are forced to abandon their stake money to Everest (as the price for not having charges pressed against them for their own attempt at cheating).

No longer able to break Everest at the poker table, Towne's group decides to take a different approach: Join forces with Nickel to try and turn Everest's associates against him. Nickel has also gained another ally: erstwhile Colorado Casino President Bart "Lowball" Rogers, recently ousted for crossing Everest one too many times. Lowball stakes Towne and his partners the $10,000 buy-in for the WCOP tournament, so that they can keep Everest preoccupied while he and Nickel put the heat on his henchmen.

Meanwhile, one of Towne's partners, Clark Marcellin (Todd Williams), brings Everest's cheating racket and attendant murders to the attention of an undercover FBI agent. In between WCOP playing sessions, Towne and his partners help the agent build a federal case against Everest. Ultimately Everest and Towne become the last two players left in the WCOP tournament. Towne wins the heads-up battle, only to learn later that Everest had deliberately thrown the hand—and had his daughter bet enough money on Towne to more than cover the prize difference between first and second place. Everest is then arrested by the FBI, but in the closing moments of the final episode a key witness against Everest is found hanged in a shower tub, as an apparent suicide.

== Cast ==
- Chris Bauer as Lee Nickel
- Eddie Cibrian as Eddie Towne
- Kristin Lehman as "Miami" (Ellen)
- Don McManus as Bart "Lowball" Rogers
- Todd Williams as Clark Marcellin
- Michael Madsen as Don "The Matador" Everest
- Michael Murphy as Jimmy Molloy

=== Cameos ===
The series featured cameo appearances by a few real-life poker personalities, all portraying themselves:

- Phil Hellmuth (professional poker player and 1989 WSOP main event champion)
- David Williams (another pro poker player, and runner-up to Greg Raymer in the 2004 WSOP championship)
- Lon McEachern and Norman Chad (commentators who cover the WSOP in real life and its fictional counterpart, the "World Championship of Poker", in the Tilt series)
- Daniel Negreanu (professional poker player and 2004 Card Player Magazine Player of the Year. Also a multiple WSOP bracelet winner)
- T. J. Cloutier (professional poker player and author, multiple WSOP bracelet winner)
- Erik Seidel (professional poker player and multiple WSOP bracelet winner)

Mike Golic and Mike Greenberg (ESPN morning talk show hosts on Mike and Mike in the Morning) appeared. Golic played one of the poker players in the tournament. He can be seen at the buffet table eating a donut during one of the tournament breaks. Greenberg played as a bartender when Clark Marcellin (Todd Williams) went to a bar after the loss of his job.

== Production ==
Filming took place primarily in Toronto, Ontario, Canada, although scenes were shot in Las Vegas in December 2004.

== Episodes ==
No.	Title	Directed by	Written by	Original release date
1	"The Game"	Brian Koppelman & David Levien	Brian Koppelman & David Levien	January 13, 2005
2	"Risk Tolerance"	T. J. Scott	Roberto Benabib, Brian Koppelman & David Levien	January 20, 2005
3	"The Whale"	Jeremiah S. Chechik	Nick Kendrick, Brian Koppelman & David Levien	January 27, 2005
4	"The Aftermath"	T. J. Scott	Lawrence Block	February 10, 2005
5	"Rivered"	Michael DeCarlo	Lawrence Block, Brian Koppelman, & David Levien	February 17, 2005
6	"Gentleman Jim"	T. J. Scott	Thomas Kelly	February 24, 2005
7	"Shuffle Up And Deal"	John Dahl	Willie Reale	March 3, 2005
8	"Nobody Ever Listens"	Jeremiah S. Chechik	Rafael Álvarez	March 10, 2005
9	"The Last Hand"	T. J. Scott	John Dahl	March 13, 2005

== See also ==
- List of television shows set in Las Vegas
