= John Dennis Johnston =

American actor (born 1950)

- Born: May 14, 1950 (age 76); Lincoln, Nebraska, US
- Other names: J.D. Johnston, J.D. Johnson, John Dennis, John Denis Johnston
- Occupation: Actor
- Years active: 1971–2013
- Spouse: Karla Pitti (m. 1981; separated)

John Dennis Johnston (born May 14, 1950) is an American film and television actor.

== Career ==
He appeared in a number of feature films including Close Encounters of the Third Kind, Streets of Fire, and Flesh+Blood, as well as various TV series such as In Plain Sight and The Golden Girls.

He appeared in both Twilight Zone: The Movie in 1983 and in one episode of the Twilight Zone TV series in 1987.

== Personal life ==
Johnston attended Hunter College in New York City where he studied drama under Lloyd Richards and Harold Clurman. In 1981, he married Karla Pitti, daughter of the cowboy-singer and actor Carl Pitti. They later separated.

A cyclist, he is a cycling safety activist who has pushed for safe-driving legislation.

== Selected filmography ==
- Captains and the Kings (1976, TV miniseries) .... Medical Orderly
- Police Woman (1976–1977, TV series) .... Arky / Bishoff
- Roots (1977, TV Mini-Series) .... Man At Cockfight
- Annie Hall (1977) .... Police Officer
- The Rockford Files (1976–1977, TV series) .... Henry Schlager / Grady Northcourt
- Close Encounters of the Third Kind (1977) .... Special Forces
- Kiss Meets the Phantom of the Park (1978, TV Movie) .... 'Chopper'
- The Rose (1979) .... Milledge
- Knots Landing (1980, TV Series) .... Alien
- Charlie's Angels (1976–1980, TV Series) .... Harley Mason / Jerry Adams
- Back Roads (1981) .... Gilly
- Best of the West (1982, TV Series) - Curtis
- The Beast Within (1982) .... Horace Platt
- The Executioner's Song (1982, TV Movie) .... Jimmy - Poker Game
- The Blue and the Gray (1982, TV Mini-Series) .... Lieutenant Hardy
- Jekyll and Hyde... Together Again (1982) .... Macho Kid
- 48 Hrs. (1982) .... Torchy's Patron
- Reckless (1983)
- Twilight Zone: The Movie (1983) .... Co-Pilot (segment "Nightmare at 20,000 Feet")
- The Rousters (1983, TV Movie)
- The Dukes of Hazzard (1983, TV Series) .... 'Sledge' Beaudry
- Lone Star Country (1983)
- Streets of Fire (1984) .... Pete The Mechanic
- A Breed Apart (1984) .... Miller
- The A-Team (1983-1985, TV series) .... Archer / 'Snake'
- Pale Rider (1985) .... Deputy Tucker
- Flesh+Blood (1985) .... Summer
- The New Twilight Zone (1987, TV series, episode: "The Junction") .... Charlie (segment "The Junction")
- St. Elsewhere (1986–1987, TV Series) .... Nick Moats
- Extreme Prejudice (1987) .... 'Merv'
- Married... with Children (1987, TV series, episode: "How Do You Spell Revenge?") .... Jimmy
- The Squeeze (1987) .... Nick
- Sunset (1988) .... Ed
- Pink Cadillac (1989) .... Waycross
- Communion (1989) .... Fireman
- Golden Girls (1989, TV series, episode: "Mary Has A Little Lamb") .... Merrill
- Murder in Mississippi (1990, TV movie) .... Hatchet-Faced Man
- Matlock (1991–1992, TV series)
- In the Best Interest of the Children (1992, TV Movie) .... Harlan Pepper
- Reasonable Doubts (1992, TV Series) .... Carl Lorkey / Carl Lurkee
- Highlander: The Series (1992, TV series, episode: "Mountain Men") .... Carl The Hermit
- Wyatt Earp (1994) .... Frank Stillwell
- Wagons East! (1994) .... Cattle Rustler (uncredited)
- Art Deco Detective (1994) .... Detective Arthur Decowitz
- In Pursuit of Honor (1995, TV Movie) .... Sergeant Thomas Mulcahey
- White Dwarf (1995, TV Movie) .... Morgus, Osh's Assistant
- A Walk in the Clouds (1995) .... Lout #1
- Wild Bill (1995) .... Ed Plummer
- The Siege at Ruby Ridge (1996, TV Movie) .... Tony Vickers
- Precious Find (1996) .... Bartender
- Forest Warrior (1996) .... Williams
- Millennium (1996, TV series, episode: "Broken World") - Sheriff Falkner
- Snide and Prejudice (1997) .... Sheffield
- Joseph's Gift (1998) .... Parker
- Heartwood (1998) .... Carl Burris
- Purgatory (1999, TV Movie) .... Lamb / 'Lefty' Slade
- Perfect Murder, Perfect Town (2000, TV movie)
- Walker, Texas Ranger (1996–2001, TV series) .... Mike Shilts / Cody Diggs
- Firestarter: Rekindled (2002, TV Mini-Series) .... Joel Lowen
- JAG (2003, TV Series) .... Barclay Cale
- Without a Trace (2005, TV Series) .... Patrick Orton
- Supernatural (2006, TV Series) .... Pa Bender
- In Plain Sight (2009–2010, TV series, episodes: "Father Goes West" and "Don't Cry for Me, Albuquerque") .... Dr. Bronstein
- The Gertrude Stein Mystery or Some Like It Art (2010; episode: "Deep Throat")
