= The Shape of Things =

- Theatrical release poster
- Directed by: Neil LaBute
- Screenplay by: Neil LaBute
- Based on: The Shape of Things by Neil LaBute
- Produced by: Neil LaBute; Gail Mutrux; Rachel Weisz; Tim Bevan; Eric Fellner
- Starring: Paul Rudd; Rachel Weisz; Gretchen Mol; Fred Weller
- Cinematography: James L. Carter
- Edited by: Joel Plotch
- Music by: Elvis Costello
- Production companies: StudioCanal; Working Title Films; Pretty Pictures
- Distributed by: Focus Features (international); Mars Distribution (France); Momentum Pictures (United Kingdom)
- Release dates: January 18, 2003 (Sundance); May 16, 2003 (United States (limited))
- Running time: 96 minutes
- Countries: United States; France; United Kingdom
- Language: English
- Budget: $4 million
- Box office: $826,617

The Shape of Things is a 2003 romantic drama film written and directed by Neil LaBute, based on his play of the same name. It stars Paul Rudd, Rachel Weisz, Gretchen Mol and Fred Weller. The story is set in a small university town in the American Midwest and focuses on the lives of four young students who become emotionally and romantically involved with each other. The film's central themes are stoicism, the limits of art, psychopathy, intimacy, and people's willingness to do things for love.

== Plot ==
When nerdy Adam Sorenson, an English Literature major at Mercy, a fictitious Midwestern college, meets Evelyn Ann Thompson, an attractive graduate art student, at the local museum where he works, his life takes an unexpected turn. Never having had much success with women, Adam is flattered when Evelyn shows an interest in him and, at her suggestion, gets a new hairstyle, begins a regular exercise regimen, eats healthier foods, dresses more stylishly, acts more confident and dominant, and begins wearing contact lenses instead of his usual eyeglasses. These initial changes regarding Adam's physical appearance are well received by Adam's friend, Phillip, and Phillip's fiancée, Jenny. Jenny knew Adam long before she met Phillip, but Adam never asked her out. Jenny takes such a liking to Adam's new physique that she makes a move on him and the two share a passionate kiss. Whether or not Adam and Jenny have sex is left ambiguous. Later, Evelyn cajoles Adam into undergoing plastic surgery to fix his large and naturally misshapen nose and succeeds in persuading him to cut himself off from Phillip and Jenny, whose relationship she ruins. He agrees.

Eventually, Adam learns that he has been part of Evelyn's MFA thesis project, a topic often mentioned in conversation but never fully explained. Evelyn presents Adam to an audience of students and faculty as her creation, announcing that she had been instructed to "change the world" by her graduate adviser, but that she had chosen to "change someone's world" instead. Her work consisted of "sculpting" Adam into a more attractive human being. Accordingly, none of the feelings she has shown him throughout the film are genuine; at no stage in their "relationship" has she fallen in love with him; her videotapes of them having sex are simply part of the project's documentation. She also announces that she is not going to marry him and the engagement ring he offered her is simply one of the exhibits of her art installation, the "capper to my time at Mercy".

Publicly humiliated and emotionally devastated, Adam confronts Evelyn in the gallery (as no one else showed up to the Q&A afterwards), demanding an explanation for her actions. She responds by saying that he should in fact be grateful to her, claiming that, objectively speaking, she has been a positive influence on his life, making him a more attractive and interesting person in the eyes of society. He calls it a heartless joke, not art, and asks for the ring back, as it was his grandmother's. Evelyn agrees. He asks her if "anything you told me about yourself was true" and she tells him what she whispered in his ear the night they had sex on tape was true.

Evelyn leaves Adam standing alone in the gallery. He goes over to the TV and pushes "Play" as it shows when the two of them were in bed making love. In tears, he watches it over and over again.

== Cast ==
- Paul Rudd as Adam Sorenson
- Rachel Weisz as Evelyn Ann Thompson
- Gretchen Mol as Jenny
- Frederick Weller as Phillip

== Play ==
The original play The Shape of Things premiered at the Temporary Almeida Theatre at Kings Cross, London in 2001, with Paul Rudd as Adam, Rachel Weisz as Evelyn, Gretchen Mol as Jenny, and Fred Weller as Phillip. The play was directed by LaBute himself. According to the author's instructions, it was to be performed without an interval or a curtain call. The play was adapted for the screen by LaBute, and features the original cast reprising their roles for the film version.

The play has since been reprised several times with new casts. Cillian Murphy and Flora Montgomery starred in the Gate Theatre production in Dublin in 2002. Brian Rhinehart directed a production at the Bernie West Theater in New York City in 2007. In January 2011, The Gallery Soho in London staged a production directed by Tom Attenborough. In 2013, Samuel Filler directed it at the Arcola Theatre. In 2023, Luke Newton and Amber Anderson starred in the Park Theatre revival in London. Traditionally, the characters are named Adam and Evelyn (a reference to the story of the Garden of Eden), but if a production may wish a gender reversal, the two leads are Amy and Evan.

== Reception ==
The film has a 64% approval rating based on 138 reviews at Rotten Tomatoes, with an average rating of 6.3/10. The website's critics consensus reads: "LaBute returns to his earlier themes of cruelty in relationships, and the results hit hard." Metacritic, which uses a weighted average, assigned the film a score of 59 out of 100, based on 35 critics, indicating "mixed or average" reviews.

== Publication ==
The Shape of Things is published in an acting edition by Broadway Play Publishing Inc.

== Sources ==
- Rush, David (2005) The Student Guide to Play Analysis, Carbondale: Southern Illinois University Press.
