= Rachel Boston =

American actress

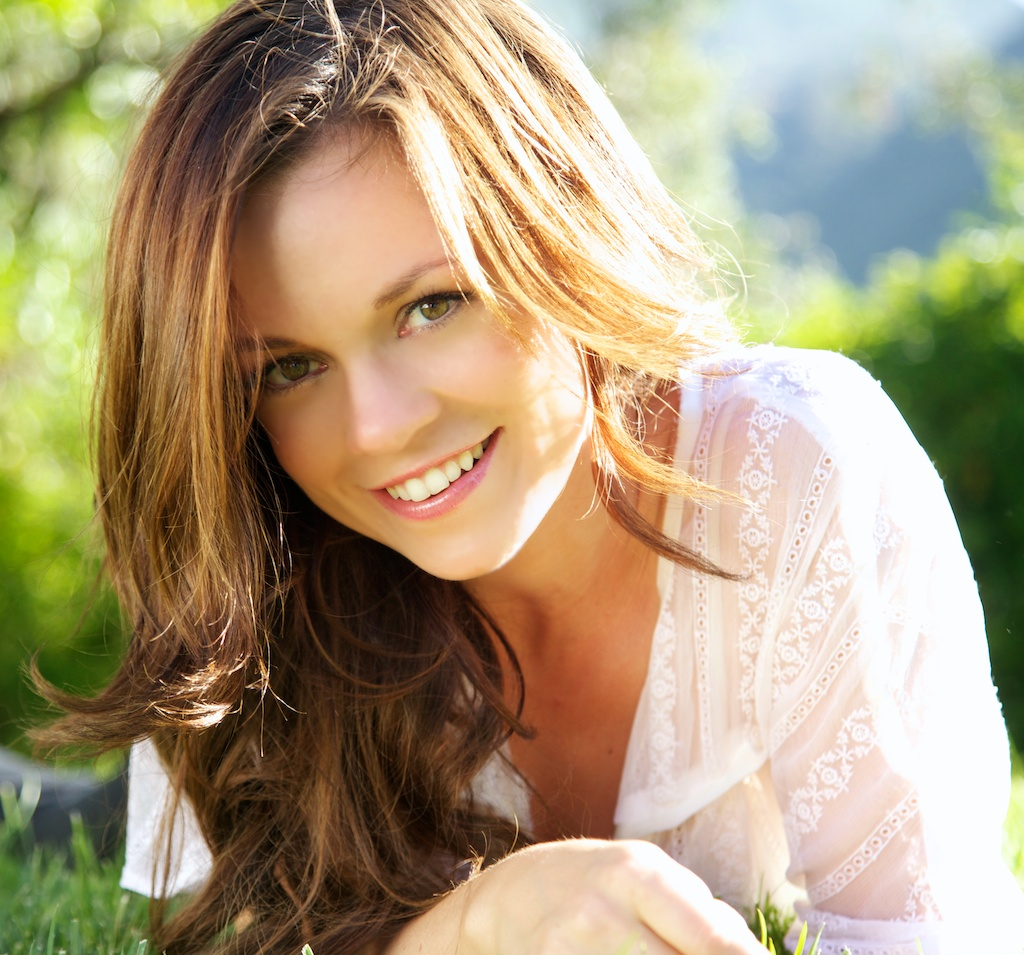
- Born: May 9, 1982 (age 44); Chattanooga, Tennessee, U.S.
- Occupation: Actress
- Years active: 2001–present
- Children: 1

Rachel Boston is an American actress. She has had leading roles in a number of independent films, and was a regular cast member in several television series. She starred in the NBC drama series American Dreams as Beth Mason from 2002 to 2005, in the short-lived CBS sitcom The Ex List in 2008, and on the USA Network series In Plain Sight from 2011 to 2012. From 2013 to 2014, Boston starred as Ingrid Beauchamp in the Lifetime fantasy-drama series Witches of East End.

== Early life and education ==
Boston was born in Chattanooga, Tennessee, to William Terry Boston and Brenda Billingsley Boston. Her father was executive vice president of power system operations for the Tennessee Valley Authority. She grew up in Signal Mountain, Tennessee, before moving to New York City at the age of seventeen to attend New York University. She was Miss Tennessee Teen USA in 1999, placing in the Top 10 at the national pageant.

== Career ==
Boston starred in the NBC series American Dreams, which aired from 2002 to 2005. She portrayed the character Beth Pryor (née Mason), the wife of the oldest son of the Pryor family, around whom the series was centered. She has made guest appearances in other series such as The Closer, Las Vegas, The Daily Show, Curb Your Enthusiasm, Grey's Anatomy, Rules of Engagement, and Crossing Jordan, and NCIS.

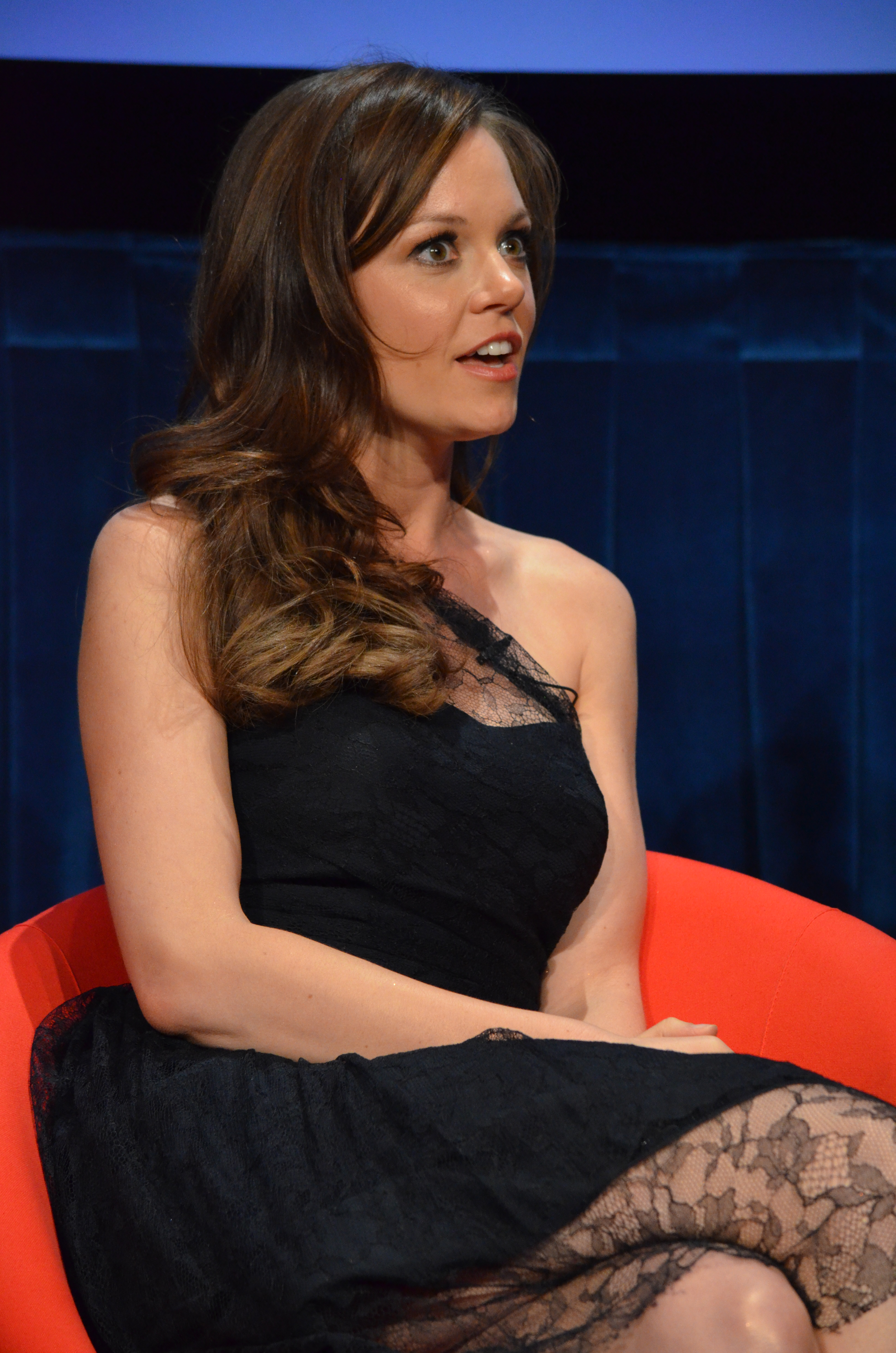
Boston at the Paley Center in April 2012

Boston landed the lead role on ABC's Ric Swartzlander comedy pilot The News (2007). The show was set in a chaotic Phoenix television newsroom. Boston played a rising star at the station who had recently been promoted to executive producer of all news programs. Boston also starred with Donal Logue in the Fox pilot "Hackett", directed by Barry Sonnenfeld, and starred with Ed O'Neill and Christine Baranski in the CBS pilot Inseparable.

Boston starred as Daphne Bloom in the short-lived CBS series The Ex List. In that same year she also guest starred on NBC's ER playing an American soldier. She filmed Ghosts of Girlfriends Past with Matthew McConaughey and Jennifer Garner in February 2008. She has also filmed 500 Days of Summer with Joseph Gordon-Levitt and Zooey Deschanel in spring 2008.

In early 2011, Boston joined the cast of USA Network's hit series In Plain Sight, where she played Abigail Chaffee, an Albuquerque Police Detective and the love interest of Marshall Mann (Frederick Weller). For the fifth and final season, Boston continued her role as a series regular.

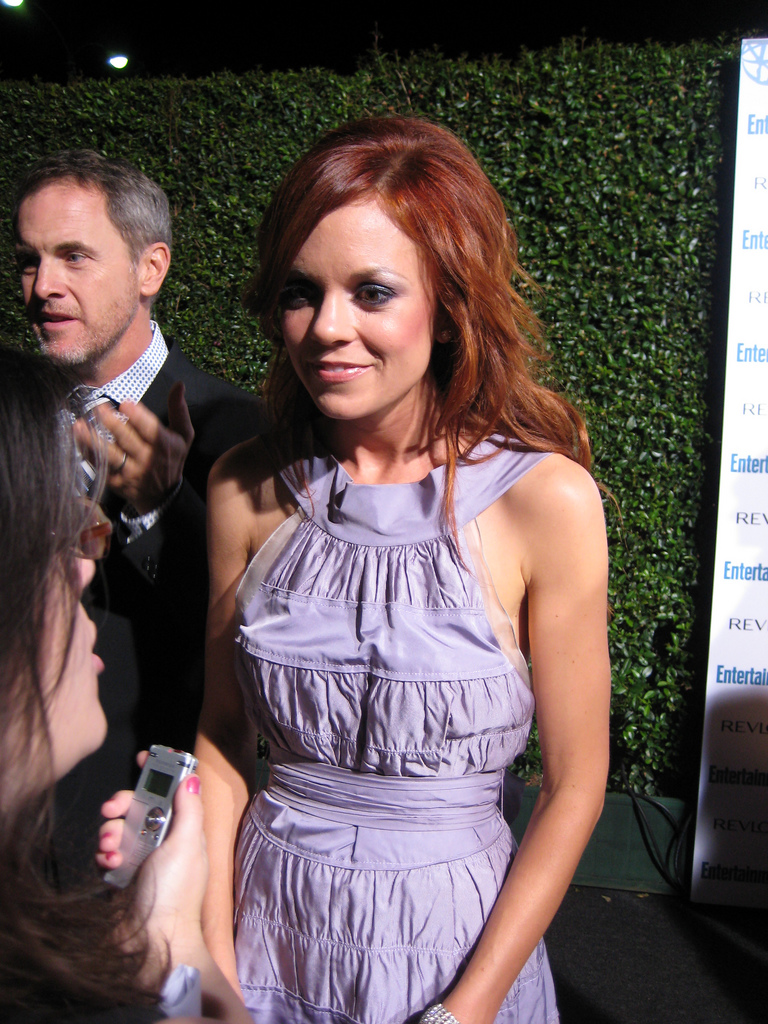
Boston at Entertainment Weekly Party, Beverly Hills Post Office, Sep 20, 2008

For her role opposite Noah Bean in the independent feature The Pill, Boston garnered rave reviews on the festival circuit and earned accolades including the Best Actress Award from the San Diego Film Festival, the Stargazer Award from the Gen Art Film Festival, and the Emerging Artist Award from the Big Apple Film Festival.

Boston was the executive producer for the independent film Black Marigolds, and also starred in the film, which reunited her with her costar from The Pill, Noah Bean. The film was shot over a two-week span in the Palomar Mountain Range of Southern California.

In 2012, Boston starred in the feature film It's a Disaster alongside Julia Stiles and America Ferrera. Also in 2012, Boston would then be cast as one of the leads in the Lifetime fantasy-drama series Witches of East End, based on a novel of the same name by Melissa de la Cruz, opposite Julia Ormond, Jenna Dewan and Mädchen Amick. The show debuted on October 6, 2013.

During her tenure on Witches of East End, she was cast in the original independent romantic comedy A Ring by Spring, a Hallmark original film, directed by Kristoffer Tabori. Shortly thereafter she was cast in Hallmark Movies & Mysteries' original telefilm A Gift of Miracles, opposite Jesse Moss and Rita Moreno.

Shortly after Lifetime's cancellation of Witches of East End, Boston signed on to Hallmark Channel's original telefim, Ice Sculpture Christmas, a part of Hallmark's 2015 Countdown to Christmas event. In April 2016, Boston completed work on Hallmark Channel's original telefilm Stop the Wedding, co-starring Niall Matter, Alan Thicke, Lini Evans and Teryl Rothery. At the end of 2016, Boston announced a partnership with Hallmark and author de la Cruz on a new original movie, Christmas in Angel Falls, about an angel who falls in love during the Christmas season.

Between 2018 and 2019, Boston would sign on to her first theatrical leading role in six years, in the film I Hate Kids opposite Tom Everett Scott. In November 2018, Boston would guest on the ABC drama The Good Doctor as Claire's college roommate and friend, Kayla, who is seeking treatment for her cancer.

== Personal life ==
Boston and professional chef Tolya Ashe were engaged June 16, 2021. In January 2022, she gave birth to the couple's first child, a baby girl named Grace.

== Filmography ==
=== Film ===
Year	Title	Role	Notes
2002	Smoking Herb	Jaquelyn Mason	
2006	Fifty Pills	Lindsay	
2009	(500) Days of Summer	Alison	
2009	Ghosts of Girlfriends Past	Deena the Bridesmaid	
2010	10 Years Later	Kyra Lee	
2011	The Pill	Mindy	
2011	Chance of Showers	Woman in Yellow	Short
2012	Blind Turn	Samantha Holt	
2012	It's a Disaster	Lexi Kivel	
2012	Holiday High School Reunion	Georgia Hunt	TV movie
2012	Coming Home	Megan Morgan	Short
2013	Black Marigolds	Kate Cole	
2013	Who the F Is Buddy Applebaum	Janie	
2014	A Ring by Spring	Caryn Briggs	TV movie
2015	A Gift of Miracles	Darcy	TV movie
2015	Ice Sculpture Christmas	Callie	TV movie
2016	Stop the Wedding	Annabelle Colton	TV movie
2017	A Rose for Christmas	Andy Lindry	TV movie
2017	Christmas in Angel Falls	Gabby Messenger	TV movie
2018	A Christmas in Tennessee	Allison Bennet	TV movie
2019	I Hate Kids	Sydney Bartlett	
2019	The Last Bridesmaid	Becca	TV movie
2019	Check Inn to Christmas	Julia Crawley	TV movie
2020	A Christmas Carousel	Lila Thomas	TV movie
2022	Dating the Delaneys	Maggie	TV movie
2022	The Engagement Plot	Hanna Knight	TV movie
2022	A Christmas Cookie Catastrophe	Anne	TV movie
2023	Field Day	Jen Davis	TV movie
2023	The More Love Grows	Helen	TV movie
2023	A Biltmore Christmas	Herself	TV Movie
2024	Debbie Macomber’s Joyful Mrs. Miracle	Mrs. Miracle	TV Movie
2025	The More the Merrier	Dr Alice Rogers	Hallmark Christmas TV Movie

=== Television ===
Year	Title	Role	Notes
2001	The Andy Dick Show	Tina	Episode: "Professor Talcum"
2002-05	American Dreams	Beth Mason	Main Cast
2005	The Closer	Jennifer	Episode: "About Face"
2005	Love, Inc.	Jill	Episode: "Thick and Thin"
2006	The Loop	Jenna	Episode: "Jack Air"
2006	Happy Hour	Shauna	Episode: "Crazy Girls"
2006	NCIS	Siri Albert	Episode: "Dead and Unburied"
2006	7th Heaven	Ms. Margo	Recurring Cast: Season 11
2006	Crumbs	Alison	Episode: "Maybe I'm Tony Randall"
2007	Grey's Anatomy	Rachel	Episode: "Great Expectations"
2007	Crossing Jordan	Geneva Todd	Episode: "Mr. Little and Mr. Big"
2007	Rules of Engagement	Amy	Episode: "Flirting with Disaster"
2007	Las Vegas	Patsy	Episode: "The Glass Is Always Cleaner"
2007	Curb Your Enthusiasm	Waitress	Episode: "The N Word"
2008	ER	Beth Ackerman	Episode: "Status Quo"
2008	The Ex List	Daphne Bloom	Main Cast
2009	The Cleaner	Ruby Geiler	Episode: "Split Ends"
2009	Eastwick	Charlene	Episode: "Fleas and Casserole"
2010	Accidentally on Purpose	Brenda	Episode: "Speed"
2010	Scoundrels	Tanya Leterre	Recurring Cast
2010	Castle	Penny Marchand	Episode: "He's Dead, She's Dead"
2011	Mad Love	Erin Sinclaire	Recurring Cast
2011–12	In Plain Sight	Det. Abigail Chaffee	Recurring Cast: Season 4, Main Cast: Season 5
2013–14	Witches of East End	Ingrid Beauchamp	Main Cast
2018	The Good Doctor	Kayla	Episode: "Hubert"
2020	Kidding	Lisa	Episode: "The Puppet Dalai Dilemma"
2020–21	SEAL Team	Hannah Oliver	Recurring Cast: Season 3–5
2025	Adventures in Love & Birding	Celeste	Hallmark Movie
