= In Plain Sight =

American drama television series (2008–2012)

- Created by: David Maples
- Starring: Mary McCormack; Fred Weller; Nichole Hiltz; Todd Williams; Lesley Ann Warren; Paul Ben-Victor; Cristián de la Fuente; Rachel Boston; Tangie Ambrose
- Theme music composer: Jeff Beal
- Composers: W. G. Snuffy Walden; Tree Adams; Liz Phair; Evan Frankfort; Marc Dauer
- Country of origin: United States
- Original language: English
- No. of seasons: 5
- No. of episodes: 61 (list of episodes)

Production
- Executive producers: David Maples; John McNamara; Paul Stupin; Dan Lerner; Natalie Chaidez; Ed Decter; John J. Strauss; John Romano; Mary McCormack
- Producers: Oscar Luis Costo; David Maples; Clara George; David Slack; Craig McNeil; Mary McCormack; Karen Moore; Mark Piznarski; John Cockrell
- Production location: Albuquerque, New Mexico
- Cinematography: John B. Aronson; Jim DeNault; David Wagerich
- Editors: Bonnie Koehler; John Bael; Jennifer Pulver; Mitchell Danton; Chris Peppe; Lori Jane Coleman; Nancy Morrison; Debby Germino; Scott K. Wallace; Sarah Boyd; Regis Kimble; Shoshanah Tanzer
- Running time: 45–48 minutes
- Production companies: Universal Media Studios (season 1); Universal Cable Productions (seasons 2–5); Pirates' Cove Entertainment; Tiny Clambake Productions; McNamara Paper Products; Frontier Pictures

Original release
- Network: USA Network
- Release: June 1, 2008 – May 4, 2012

In Plain Sight is an American drama television series that premiered on the USA Network on June 1, 2008. The series revolves around Mary Shannon (Mary McCormack), a deputy United States marshal attached to the Albuquerque, New Mexico, office of the Federal Witness Security Program, more commonly known as WITSEC. Shannon must find ways to balance her professional life of protecting witnesses, her professional relationship with her work partner, US Marshal Marshall Mann, and her problematic personal life. The show was filmed on location in Albuquerque. In Plain Sight concluded on May 4, 2012, after five seasons.

== Development and production ==
In Plain Sight was originally scheduled to premiere on Thursday, April 24, 2008, but USA Network held the series back when the WGA strike delayed production of the summer series Burn Notice. It instead made its debut on Sunday, June 1, 2008. It was renewed on July 21, 2008, for a second season with a 16-episode run, which began April 19, 2009.

Then, following creative differences with the executive producer, David Maples, USA Network made the decision to use the season's 15th episode, the first part of a planned two-part season-ender, as the show's season finale. Series creator Maples and co-producer Paul Stupin subsequently stepped down as executive producers at the end of season two, although they remained as consulting producers, and were replaced by John McNamara. Todd Williams and Lesley Ann Warren's roles were changed to guest stars, and a retooling of scriptwriting was designed to place greater emphasis on Mary's cases and less on her personal life, while retaining its character-driven storytelling. According to USA executive Jeff Wachtel, the shift in producers also reflects the network's desire that the show remain upbeat rather than overly dark.

In Plain Sight was renewed for a third season of 16 episodes on August 2, 2009. Although the previously planned 16th episode of season two was set to be the opening episode of season three, the episode was shelved and replaced by a new opening episode, written by new showrunner, John McNamara. The season was later reduced to 13 episodes when McNamara took a leave of absence for medical reasons. In a statement released exclusively to the Futon Critic, the producer of Universal Cable Productions said, "John Romano assumed executive producer responsibilities for the remaining episodes. Given the unexpected change, we decided to end the season at a natural spot—with the surprising cliffhanger of episode 13."

After the conclusion of season three, USA Network ordered two more seasons of In Plain Sight. The fourth season premiered on May 1, 2011, in its original time slot. The fifth and final season began on March 16, 2012, and consisted of eight episodes. The series finale aired on May 4, 2012.

Jeff Beal composed the theme song for the series. W. G. Snuffy Walden composed the music for the first season, followed by Tree Adams for the second season. Evan Frankfort, Liz Phair, and Marc Dauer composed the music for the remainder of the series.

== Cast and characters ==
=== Main characters ===
- Mary Shannon (Mary McCormack): Mary is a capable officer, a nonconformist uninterested in typical feminine wiles. To her witnesses, she is known as Mary Shepard. She has trust and abandonment issues that lead her to have difficulties with relationships due to a difficult childhood resulting from her fugitive father's abandonment and her mother's alcoholism. During the first two seasons, Mary dates Raphael "Raph" Ramirez, a minor-league baseball player, and they eventually become engaged; however, she often seems unhappy with the relationship and the engagement, and her feelings of doubt about marriage cause Raphael to call off the engagement during the third season. During the fourth season, she has a one-night stand with her ex-husband, Mark, and becomes pregnant. Throughout her pregnancy, Mary is convinced that she wants to give the baby up for adoption and becomes agitated whenever everyone around her starts treating her differently. In the season-four finale, "Something Borrowed, Something Blew Up", she goes into premature labor. In the season-five premiere, "The Anti-Social Network", after Mary gave birth to a daughter, she changed her mind about giving her up and decided to keep her because she felt that no one could protect her baby better than she could. She names her daughter Norah Shannon, and shares custody with Mark. During the final season, she meets and begins a relationship with Kenny, a single dad.
- Marshall Mann (Fred Weller): A fifth-generation deputy U.S. marshal, to his witnesses, he is known as Marshall Miller. Marshall Mann is Mary's partner, as well as her best (and only) friend, and occasionally appeared to desire more than her friendship as the series progressed. Laconic and laid-back, he seems to know a little about everything, what Mary calls "useless information", and is rarely ever speechless. The only time this has ever happened was in the season-three episode "Whistle Stop", when he discovered Raphael and Mary had broken up, leading her to declare him "verbally impotent". Friction between Marshall and Mary occurs at times, often due to Marshall's cerebral approach and Mary's gut instinct, though both are extremely protective of witnesses and each other. Though Mary and Marshall have occasionally disagreed about the proper course of action regarding policies, Marshall has typically backed down after taking time to get a perspective and will adopt Mary's position if her cause is right—even when her attitude is not. In later seasons, Marshall begins a relationship with Detective Abigail Chaffee of the Albuquerque police force. Abigail and he eventually move in together and ultimately become engaged. In the series finale, he is made chief inspector for WITSEC's southwest region.
- Stan McQueen (Paul Ben-Victor): As chief inspector for WITSEC's southwest region, Stan is Marshall and Mary's boss. He is a flexible boss and stand-up guy, quickly backing up both Marshall and Mary when they hit trouble. Stan likes to stick to official WITSEC doctrine as often as possible and is reluctant to bend the rules without authorization. Stan has made an effort to recreate the professional distance in his office, presumably as a way to shield his team from FBI fallout. During the second season, Eleanor and he have a one-time intimate encounter. In the final season, he begins a relationship with his dance instructor, Lia Hernandez, and gets promoted to chief deputy director of WITSEC in Washington, DC.
- Jinx Shannon (Lesley Ann Warren): Mary's alcoholic mother, she was abandoned by her bank-robbing husband to raise her two daughters alone. Although she adores her daughters, she has never been a traditional, supportive, job-holding, maternal figure. She recognizes that Mary is the stable member of their family, and this has inspired her to live up to her daughter's example. Even so, she initially harbors a great deal of resentment against her strong-willed daughter, though this only comes to the surface when she is under great emotional duress. Firmly on the path to recovery, Jinx slowly grows into her own woman, apart from the conniving lifestyle she once enjoyed while being an alcoholic. Currently sober, she still follows Mary's lead, but is slowly becoming more reliable now, having a job and a house of her own. In the final season, she goes to Miami to support Brandi while she is going through rehabilitation for alcoholism.
- Brandi Shannon (Nichole Hiltz): Mary's younger sister, she is very much her mother's daughter and the baby of the family. She lives in the moment and was originally involved with a shady man named Chuck. Despite this, she looks up to Mary, and at times, sees her as an example. She also tends to be the more mature figure in her relationship with her mother. Brandi is loyal to a fault, but is slowly developing a conscience independent of others' approval. Moved by seeing a young infant in the hands of a meth addict and a drug-dealing boyfriend, Brandi backed out of a drug deal initiated by Chuck so child services would protect the baby. Later, once Mary was rescued from her abduction (which was a fallout from this decision), Brandi later admits privately that if she had known how the events would play out, she would have killed Chuck herself rather than let her sister come into harm's way from her actions. During the second season, she meets and dates Peter Alpert, a man she met in Alcoholics Anonymous, who later turned out to be very rich (Mary stated he "owns half of Albuquerque"). Brandi takes this information differently, believing she is just "one of his girls" and initially tries to act selfishly to have him break up with her. After he stays with her (even offering hang-over remedies), he states his desire that they continue to date, to which she agrees. Brandi eventually moves in with Peter, and in the beginning of the fourth season, she informs Mary that Peter and she are engaged. However, in the season-four finale "Something Borrowed, Something Blew Up", Brandi feels ill-equipped to marry Peter and live as his high-class wife, and she suffers a breakdown on her wedding day and leaves Peter at the altar. During season five, since the wedding fiasco, she has developed a drinking problem, and with the support of Jinx, enters a rehabilitation program. In the series finale, she returns and is revealed to be pregnant, and tells Mary she has decided to keep the baby and move back home to Albuquerque to be near their family.
- Detective Abigail Chaffee (Rachel Boston): Albuquerque Police Department detective and Marshall's girlfriend, Abigail is extremely outgoing and friendly, much to the annoyance of Mary. During the final season, Marshall proposes to Abigail and she accepts. Later, Abigail tells Marshall he needs to make their relationship a bigger priority than Mary if their relationship is too stand a chance.
- Delia Parmalee (Tangie Ambrose): A new WITSEC inspector, she joins the cast in season four. She is known for her cheerful, optimistic attitude despite the seriousness of her job.

=== Recurring characters ===
- Raphael Ramirez (Cristián de la Fuente): Mary's former fiancé, commonly known as "Raph", is a Dominican minor-league baseball player for the Albuquerque Isotopes until injuries forced his retirement. His relationship with Mary was complicated for a time when he became close to her sister Brandi. After Mary was kidnapped by drug dealers, Raph disposed of a suitcase full of drugs Brandi brought to Albuquerque, which Mary eventually discovers. When they become engaged, Mary tells Raph what she does for a living, which proves difficult for Raph to understand. Raph is aware of Mary's doubts about marriage, which finally leads to his decision to call off their engagement. In the final season, Mary runs into Raph, who tells her he is now married, and his wife and he meet Mary for dinner. Later, Raph stops by and wishes Mary well with her life, parting on good terms.
- Peter Alpert (Joshua Malina): Brandi's boyfriend and a wealthy businessman, he meets Brandi at an AA meeting, where she pretends to be Jinx for her mother to pass a required AA meeting set by the courts. Despite initially disapproving of Brandi's actions, Peter begins dating Brandi after she makes a determined effort to apologize to him. They later become engaged and plan for their wedding during the fourth season, but Peter is left at the altar when Brandi decides at the last minute not to go through with the wedding.
- Scott Griffin (Aaron Ashmore): Mary's half-brother, he, along with his sister, is Mary's father's child from a later marriage about which Mary knew nothing. Brandi goes in search of him and brings him to Albuquerque. Scott is revealed to have a gambling problem, but works hard to beat it. He is later shown in the final season when Mary and his father reappears and Mary tries to talk him into entering WITSEC to avoid an old enemy of their father's, but Scott refuses, resulting in his eventual death.
- Detective Robert Dershowitz (Todd Williams): A homicide detective, known as Bobby D, he is occasionally assigned to cases involving Mary's witnesses. He has deduced that Mary is a U.S. marshal working for WITSEC and does not hide his disgust for the branch of law enforcement that puts known criminals back on the street. This attitude has softened as Dershowitz becomes involved in cases associated with the Marshal Service's witnesses. While his relationship with Mary had been antagonistic at times, he gradually develops a real friendship with her. After her disappearance, Marshall and he bonded during the subsequent investigation, resulting in a respect for the two marshals, though he occasionally disagrees with the less savory parts of their jobs. Currently, he is in a task force in Chicago.
- Eleanor Prince (Holly Maples): The recently widowed WITSEC office manager, both her deceased husband and she worked for the FBI. Eleanor's calm efficiency clashes with Mary's abrasive work style, but earns the affection of Stan and the admiration of Marshall. In times of emergency, Eleanor uses her connections in the FBI to assist with Mary and Marshall's cases, particularly ones that have dealt with Agent O'Conner's relentless pursuit of Mary and her family. Eleanor eventually leaves WITSEC to take a position as an analyst with the FBI.
- Special Agent Robert O'Conner (Will McCormack): A New Jersey–based FBI agent now working in Albuquerque, he is in charge of investigating the murders related to the drug dealing in which Brandi was involved and has relentlessly focused his investigation on Brandi. He also becomes interested in the whereabouts of Mary and Brandi's father. Mary and he have an extremely hostile relationship. Will McCormack is Mary McCormack's younger brother in real life.
- Special Agent Michael Faber (Steven Weber): He is an FBI agent with whom Mary has a brief relationship after they work on a case together. He tells Mary about his relationship with his father, something Faber tries hard not to repeat with his own son. Mary eventually convinces him to reunite with his son and his ex-wife.

== Episodes ==
Season	Episodes	Originally released	
Season	Episodes	First released	Last released
1	12	June 1, 2008	August 17, 2008
2	15	April 19, 2009	August 9, 2009
3	13	March 31, 2010	June 30, 2010
4	13	May 1, 2011	August 7, 2011
5	8	March 16, 2012	May 4, 2012

== Reception ==
=== Ratings ===
The pilot episode of In Plain Sight attracted 5.25 million viewers, making it USA Network's highest-rated series premiere since Psych in 2006. It also outperformed the previous summer's debut of Burn Notice by 32% and the network premiere of Law & Order: Criminal Intent by 40%.

Season	Time slot (ET)	Episodes	Premiered		Ended		TV Season	Viewers (in millions)
Season	Time slot (ET)	Episodes	Date	Premiere Viewers (in millions)	Date	Finale Viewers (in millions)	TV Season	Viewers (in millions)
1	Sunday 10:00 p.m.	12	June 1, 2008	5.25	August 17, 2008	3.78	2008	TBA
2	Sunday 10:00 p.m.	15	April 19, 2009	5.11	August 9, 2009	4.44	2009	4.98
3	Wednesday 10:00 p.m.	13	March 31, 2010	3.81	June 30, 2010	3.85	2010	4.93
4	Sunday 10:00 p.m.	13	May 1, 2011	3.87	August 7, 2011	4.09	2011	5.00
5	Friday 10:00 p.m.	8	March 16, 2012	4.01	May 4, 2012	3.20	2012	TBA

=== Awards and nominations ===
Awards and nominations for In Plain Sight
Year	Group	Award	Result	For
2009	NAMIC Vision Awards	Vision Award – Drama	Nominated	
2009	Prism Awards	Drama Series – Mental Health	Nominated	Episode "High-Priced Spread"
2009	Prism Awards	Performance in a Drama Episode	Nominated	Mary McCormack
2011	WICT Awards	Scripted Drama/Comedy Series or Special	Won	

=== Home media ===
On March 31, 2009, Universal Studios Home Entertainment released season one of In Plain Sight on DVD in Region 1. Season two was released on DVD on March 9, 2010.

DVD name	Ep #	Release date
Season One	12	March 31, 2009
Season Two	15	March 9, 2010
Season Three	13	March 29, 2011
Season Four	13	June 5, 2012^{1}
Season Five	8	August 28, 2012

^1 The wide release for the season-four DVD occurred on June 5, 2012. An early promotional release at Target stores occurred on March 13, 2012.

=== Syndication ===
Start TV started airing reruns on October 14, 2019 and removed the show from its lineup on May 14, 2026.
