= Todd Williams (actor) =

American actor (born 1977)

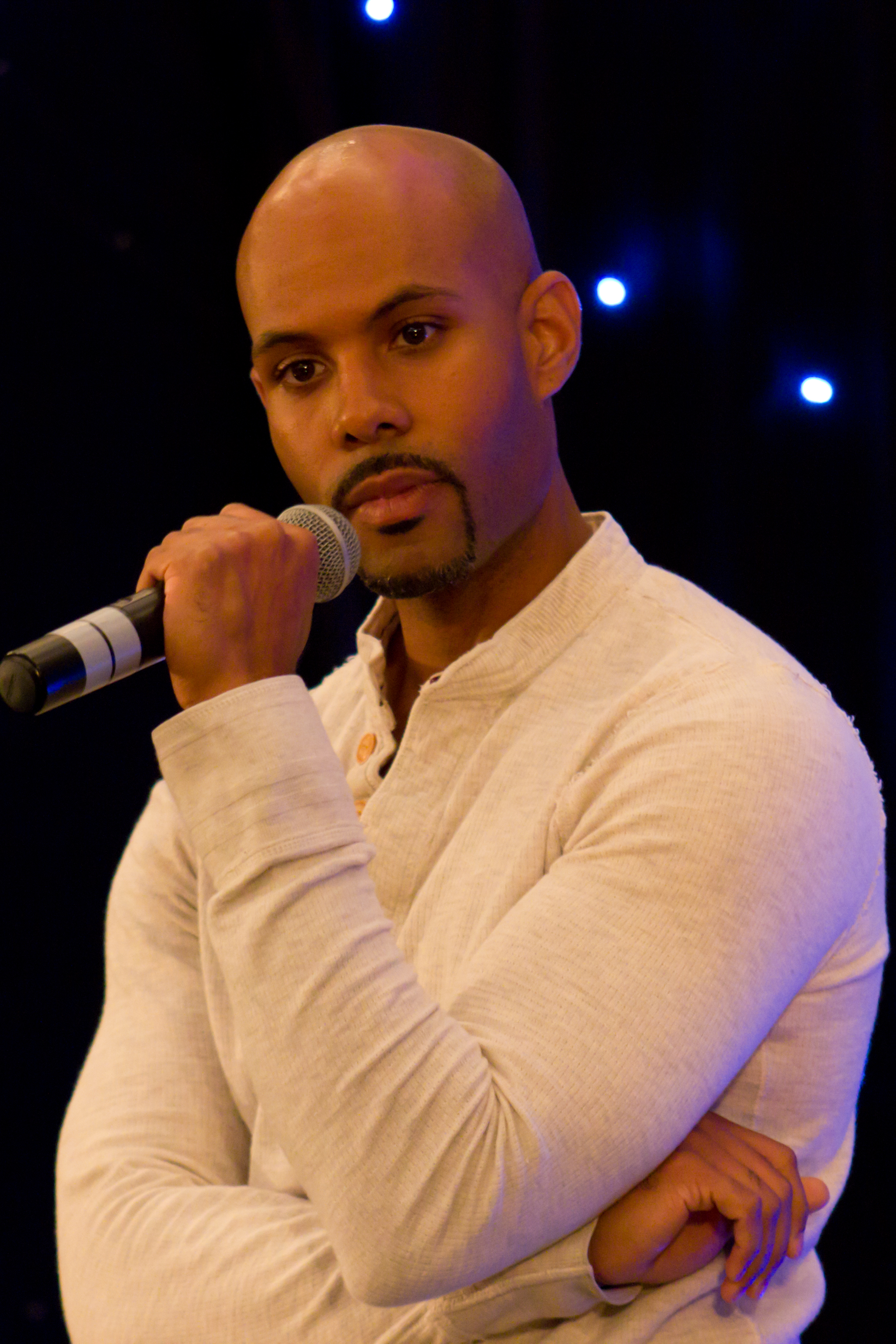
- Williams in 2013
- Born: Todd Williams III; September 11, 1977 (age 48); Queens, New York, U.S.
- Education: Talent Unlimited High School; New York University
- Occupation: Actor
- Years active: 2001–present

Todd Williams III (born September 11, 1977) is an American actor best known for his role as Officer Isaac Joiner on the crime drama television series The Chicago Code.

== Early life and education ==
Born in Queens, New York, Williams began the pursuit of his acting career while attending Talent Unlimited High School in Manhattan. Concerned about having a backup plan, he chose to explore another one of his artistic passions after graduating, and applied himself to the course study of Music Business at New York University. Not satisfied, Williams subsequently left NYU to focus on his acting career goals full-time.

== Career ==
After booking several national commercial and voice-over spots, he made his film debut opposite Kerry Washington in the critically acclaimed feature Lift. Several television appearances followed on shows such as Law & Order: Special Victims Unit and The Twilight Zone. In 2004, while recurring on Third Watch, Williams booked a role alongside Michael Madsen in the ESPN original series Tilt.

After relocating to Los Angeles in 2005, he secured numerous guest leads on shows such as CSI, CSI: Miami, and the CW’s The Game. In addition, he landed another lead role with Anthony Anderson in the indie film, The Last Stand. Williams also portrayed the role of Connor Jordan in season 4 of the CW's The Vampire Diaries In 2010, after spending two seasons on the USA Network series In Plain Sight, he landed a series regular role on the Fox series The Chicago Code which premiered on February 7, 2011.

== Filmography ==
=== Film ===
Year	Title	Role	Notes
2001	Lift	Christian	
2004	Chameleon	Basketball Player	Short
2006	The Last Stand	Bo Clark	
2015	San Andreas	Marcus	
2015	Silver Skies	Marcus	
2019	If Not Now, When?	Carl	

=== Television ===
Year	Title	Role	Notes
2001	Law & Order: Special Victims Unit	Uniform #1/Rodney Thompson	Episode: "Folly" & "Rooftop"
2003	The Twilight Zone	Marcus Fisher	Episode: "Tagged"
2004	Third Watch	Detective Barlow	Recurring cast: season 6
2005	Tilt	Clark Marcellin	Main cast
2005	Head Cases	King Bling	Episode: "Malpratice Makes Perfect"
2006	CSI: Miami	Kevin Iverson	Episode: "Death Pool 100"
2006	The Game	Trent	Episode: "There's No Place Like Home"
2007	CSI: Crime Scene Investigation	Jeffrey Lanier	Episode: "The Good, the Bad, and the Dominatrix"
2008-09	In Plain Sight	Detective Robert Dershowitz	Recurring cast: season 1-2
2011	The Chicago Code	Isaac Joiner (Police officer)	Main cast
2012-13	The Vampire Diaries	Connor Jordan	Recurring cast: Season 4
2013	Switched at Birth	Zane	Recurring cast: Season 2
2014-17	Teen Wolf	Dr. Geyer	Recurring cast: season 4-5, guest: season 6
2015	Criminal Minds	Detective Spreewell	Episode: "Protection"
2015	Blood & Oil	Agent Reese	Recurring cast
2016	Scorpion	Agent Bush	Episode: "We're Gonna Need a Bigger Vote"
2016-17	Good Behavior	Sean Barron	Recurring cast
2018	9-1-1	Aaron Brooks	Episode: "Karma's a Bitch" & "Trapped"
2019	Ballers	Gavin	Episode: "Crumbs"
2019-21	All Rise	Robin Taylor	Recurring cast: season 1-2
2021	Panic	Capt. John Williams	Recurring cast
2024	Batwheels	John Stewart / Green Lantern	Voice; episode: "Spiffledipped"
2025-present	Invincible	Titan	Voice; 2 episodes; replaces Mahershala Ali
2025	Marvel Zombies	Eric Brooks / Blade / Moon Knight	Voice; 4 episodes

=== Video games ===
Year	Title	Role	Notes
2006	Superman Returns: The Video Game	Mongul (voice)	
2020	Spider-Man: Miles Morales	Rick Mason (voice)	
2026	Invincible VS	Titan (voice)	
