= Nichole Hiltz =

American actress

- Born: September 3, 1978 (age 48)
- Occupation: Actress
- Years active: 1999–2012

Nichole Hiltz (born September 3, 1978) is an American former actress. She appeared in several films, made-for-TV movies, and television series. Her last credit was for USA Network's In Plain Sight from 2008 to 2012 in which she portrayed Brandi Shannon, younger sister of the main character.

Hiltz has made guest appearances on several television shows, including NYPD Blue, The O.C., Strong Medicine, Cold Case, The Shield, Buffy the Vampire Slayer, V.I.P., CSI: Crime Scene Investigation, Bones, and Smallville. She also appeared in three episodes of Desperate Housewives. She played the semiregular character Ginny Dannegan in The Riches.

== Early life ==
Hiltz got into acting via performers such as Michelle Pfeiffer and the show Punky Brewster. This would lead her to take acting classes in Boston after high school.

== Personal life ==
For a short time in 2006, Hiltz was engaged to Canadian actor Mike Smith (of Trailer Park Boys fame). The two actors met during the filming of Trailer Park Boys: The Big Dirty.

== Filmography ==
=== Film ===
| Year | Title | Role | Notes |
|---|---|---|---|
| 1999 | Sporting Dog | Fantasy Girl #1 | Short film |
| 2000 | Dude, Where's My Car? | Alien Jumpsuit Chick #2 | |
| 2001 | Amazons and Gladiators | Serena | |
| 2001 | Shallow Hal | Night Club Goer #2 | |
| 2002 | May | Ambrosia | |
| 2002 | Austin Powers in Goldmember | French Teacher | |
| 2002 | A Midsummer Night's Rave | Britt | |
| 2003 | Scorched | Blonde Bikini Girl | |
| 2003 | Art of Revenge | Tuesday Arcatur | Video |
| 2003 | Where's Angelo? | Sondra | Video |
| 2003 | Something's Gotta Give | Harry's Lunch Date | |
| 2004 | Perfect Opposites | Celeste | |
| 2004 | Renegade | Lola | |
| 2004 | Spanglish | Yuppie Girl | |
| 2004 | Full Clip | Shelly | |
| 2005 | Venice Underground | Samantha | |
| 2005 | All Souls Day | Erica | |
| 2005 | The Adventures of Big Handsome Guy and His Little Friend | Super Hot Girl | Short film |
| 2006 | Alien Autopsy | Amber Fuentes | |
| 2006 | Trailer Park Boys: The Movie | Wanda | |
| 2008 | Trailer Park of Terror | Norma | |
| 2008 | Life at the Trailer Park of Terror | Norma | Video short |
| 2010 | Leonie | Ethel Ames | |
| 2012 | Should've Been Romeo | Anna | |

=== Television ===
| Year | Title | Role | Notes |
|---|---|---|---|
| 2001 | CSI: Crime Scene Investigation | Dancer | Episode: "Table Stakes" |
| 2001 | Signs of Life | Belinda | Episode: "Pilot" |
| 2002 | V.I.P. | Jenna Murphy | Episode: "Diagnosis Val" |
| 2002 | Buffy the Vampire Slayer | Diana | Episode: "Seeing Red" |
| 2002–2003 | The Shield | Tulips | Episode: "Dragonchasers", "Barnstormers" |
| 2003 | The Best Sex Ever | Crystal | Episode: "Dirty Dancing" |
| 2003 | The O.C. | Gabrielle | Episode: "The Girlfriend" |
| 2003 | CSI: Crime Scene Investigation | Natasha Rifkin | Episode: "Assume Nothing" |
| 2004 | Cold Case | Doreen Denova (1978) | Episode: "Disco Inferno" |
| 2004 | Good Girls Don't | Lizzie | 8 episodes |
| 2004 | NYPD Blue | Eva Warm | Episode: "On the Fence" |
| 2005 | NYPD Blue | Amy Rasmussen | Episode: "Old Man Quiver" |
| 2005 | Strong Medicine | Katie Burke | Episode: "First Response" |
| 2006 | Gay Robot | Misty | TV movie |
| 2006 | Las Vegas | Anniversary Girl | Episode: "Bait and Switch" |
| 2006 | Masters of Horror | Danielle (uncredited) | Episode: "Sick Girl" |
| 2006 | Smallville | Simone Charcot | Episode: "Hypnotic" |
| 2006 | Desperate Housewives | Libby Collins | 3 episodes |
| 2007 | Human Giant | Tina | Episode: "Let's Go" |
| 2007–2008 | The Riches | Ginny Dannegan | 9 episodes |
| 2008 | Wainy Days | Jessica | Episode: "Angel" |
| 2008–2009 | Bones | Roxie Lyon | Episode: "The Skull in the Sculpture"; Episode: "The Passenger in the Oven"; Episode: "The Salt in the Wounds" |
| 2008–2012 | In Plain Sight | Brandi Shannon | 50 episodes |
| 2011 | Pretend Time | Flying Stripper | Episode: "Flying Stripper" |
