= Joshua Malina =

American actor (born 1966)

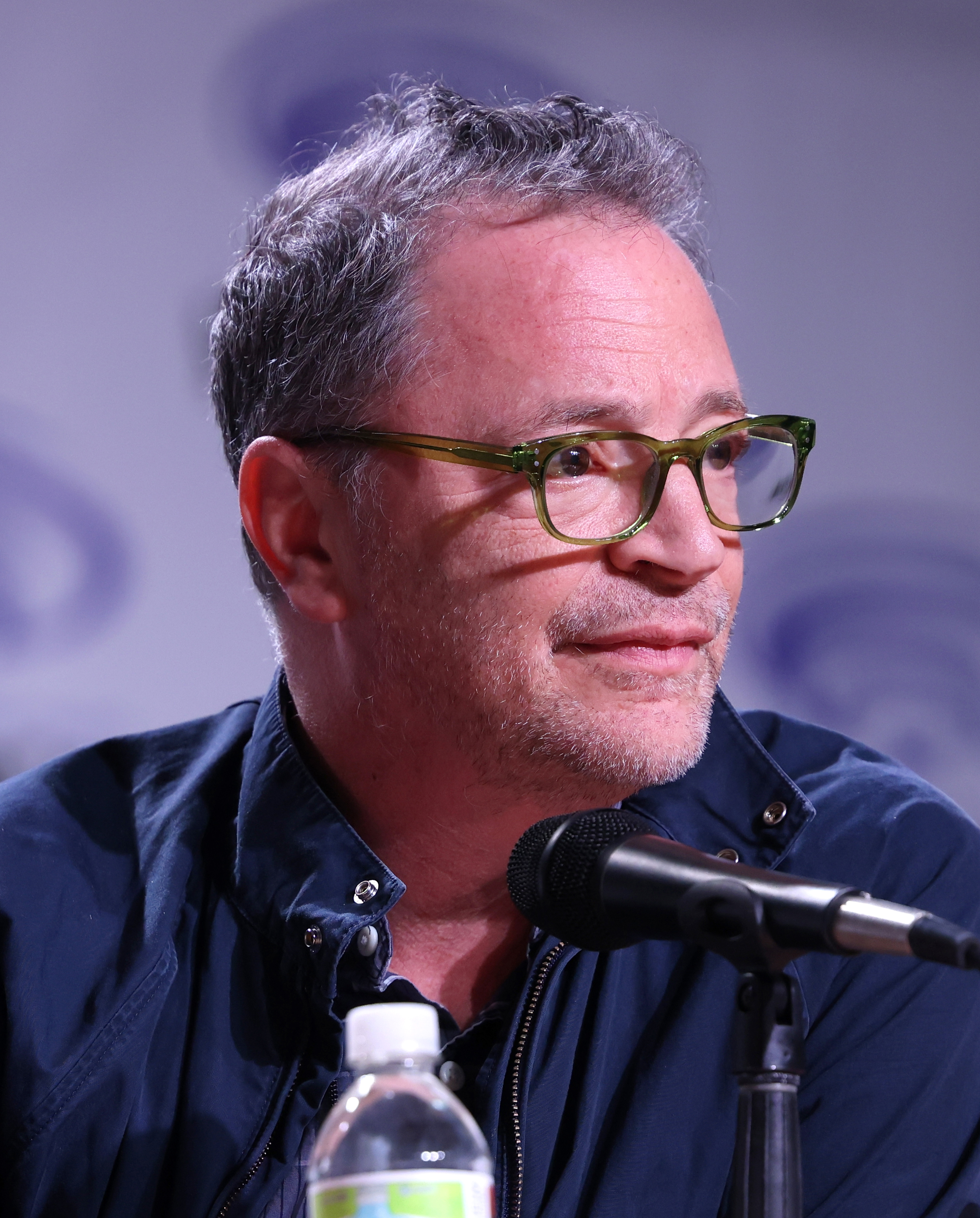
- Malina in 2025
- Born: Joshua Charles Malina; January 17, 1966 (age 60); New York City, New York, U.S.
- Education: Yale University
- Occupation: Actor
- Years active: 1992–present
- Spouse: Melissa Merwin (m. 1996; div. 2024)
- Children: 2

Joshua Charles Malina (born January 17, 1966) is an American film and stage actor known for playing Will Bailey on the NBC drama The West Wing, Jeremy Goodwin on Sports Night, U.S. Attorney General David Rosen on Scandal, and Caltech President Siebert on The Big Bang Theory.

== Early life and education ==
Malina was born in New York City. His parents, Robert and Fran Malina, were founding members of Young Israel of Scarsdale in New Rochelle, where he grew up. His father was an attorney, investment banker and Broadway producer. The actor has commented that while the name "Malina" does not sound Jewish to most people and often leads them to assume he is Latino (often due to confusion with the Spanish surname Molina), the name is in fact Czech in origin, from the "Czech [word] for 'raspberry'".

Malina attended middle school at Westchester Day School and high school at the Horace Mann School. He earned a B.A. in Theater from Yale University. At Yale, he was a member of The Spizzwinks, an a cappella group, together with fellow actor Noah Emmerich.

== Career ==
=== Theatre ===
Malina made his acting debut in the Broadway production of Aaron Sorkin's A Few Good Men, and later in the play's run moved into a major role. Malina had contacted Sorkin initially at the suggestion of his parents when he first went to New York City, as they knew Sorkin was a high-school classmate and friend of Malina's cousins. The cousins, in turn, had spoken highly of Malina to Sorkin, who suggested he audition for the play.

Malina has joked in interviews that Sorkin's casting him in subsequent productions may owe to the fact that he once performed the Heimlich maneuver on Sorkin, saving his life, when the writer began to choke while eating a hamburger at a bowling match with the cast of the play. He has since appeared in many Sorkin film and TV projects.

In March 2023, Malina took over the lead role of Hermann Merz in the Broadway production of Tom Stoppard's Leopoldstadt. In 2024 he performed in London in What We Talk About When We Talk About Anne Frank at the Marylebone Theatre.

=== Film and television ===
Malina's first job in the film business was as a production assistant on the Chevy Chase comedy Fletch Lives, an ill-received sequel to Chase's hit movie Fletch. His first on-screen appearance was a three-line, five-word role in the film version of A Few Good Men, where he has said he appreciated the dedication that star Jack Nicholson showed by performing his lines in the scene himself even though his character was off-screen and could easily have been played for him by a crew member. In his next film, Sorkin's The American President, Malina had a somewhat larger role as assistant to Annette Bening's environmental-activist character.

Malina played two different characters over four episodes on the talk-show satire The Larry Sanders Show. He appeared first in 1993 as Robert Brody, a fictional reporter for the real-life magazine Entertainment Weekly, to whom actor John Ritter gives a scathing interview after having his appearance in the show cancelled to make room for musician Warren Zevon to play a second song (episode: "Off Camera"). Five years later, Malina returned in a recurring role as Kenny Mitchell, a sleazy network executive who pushes Larry Sanders out of the show in favor of Jon Stewart.

From 1998 to 2000, Malina starred as character Jeremy Goodwin on Sorkin's Sports Night, a show that attracted him from the moment Sorkin sent him the pilot script. The Goodwin character began as a research analyst, but was promoted to associate producer by the second season, creating a larger role for Malina.

The critically acclaimed show was unable to find a large fan base and was canceled after two seasons, with some critics saying the show's troubles were exacerbated by having to share Sorkin's time with his concurrent project on rival network NBC, The West Wing. The actor counts Sports Night among his most popular roles and noted on the occasion of the show's 10th-anniversary DVD release, "If my straw poll of who stops me to say what is any indication, West Wing may only slightly edge Sports Night."

Following the panned Hank Azaria vehicle Imagine That – where both he and Azaria were described as "talent going to waste" – Malina played Will Bailey on The West Wing from 2002 to 2006. His character initially was perceived by the public as an attempt to replace departing series star Rob Lowe, although Malina said in numerous interviews that the two actors and characters were too dissimilar to be viewed as anything but a change.

During his tenure on The West Wing, Malina was known to the rest of the cast as a tireless prankster. It is said he coated telephones with Vaseline and reset producer Alex Graves's iPod menus to Mandarin Chinese. He stole some of Bradley Whitford's letterhead stationery and used it in an elaborate prank. At the suggestion of co-star Janel Moloney, Malina sent a $200 Valentine's Day bouquet to season-six newcomer Jimmy Smits that included a card crafted on Whitford's stolen letterhead stating: "Jimmy, You are a delight. I enjoyed every moment we've had together. Be my Valentine." Partially as a response, Whitford scripted Malina's character to say "I can't act. I'm a terrible actor," when he wrote an episode of The West Wing, and after the end of the show both have continued to jokingly mock each other on social media and in interviews.

Following the end of The West Wing, Malina campaigned for the leading role of Danny Tripp in Sorkin's next TV project, Studio 60 on the Sunset Strip, but the role went instead to Whitford. When the show was cancelled in its first season, Malina was teased by some in the industry who suggested he was Sorkin's good luck charm, but he pointed to Sorkin's upcoming film Charlie Wilson's War as evidence his friend could succeed without him.

In 2007, Malina became one of the four stars of the short-lived ABC dramedy Big Shots. His character, Karl Mixworthy, was a pharmaceutical company executive juggling a wife and a mistress, who meet when the jilted lover tries to expose him to his wife but befriends her instead.

Malina is a co-creator and producer of Bravo's cable TV series Celebrity Poker Showdown. In private life, he is an avid poker player, having played with Sorkin while on Broadway, used poker winnings to pay his rent early in his career, and organized a cast-and-crew game that lasted the full duration of Sports Night and occasionally delayed the start of shooting. The idea for the show came from a weekly high-stakes poker game hosted by Hank Azaria, which Malina and friend Andrew Hill Newman attended.

From 2011 to 2019, Malina appeared as University President Siebert on The Big Bang Theory.

In 2012, Malina held a recurring role on ABC's Scandal as Assistant U.S. Attorney David Rosen. He was promoted to a series regular for season 2.

Malina co-hosted the podcast The West Wing Weekly with Hrishikesh Hirway. The series debuted in March 2016, and ended in January 2020.

=== Philanthropy ===
In 2004, Malina was a participant in the first-ever national television advertising campaign supporting donations to Jewish federations. The program featured "film and television personalities celebrating their Jewish heritage and promoting charitable giving to the Jewish community" and included Greg Grunberg, Marlee Matlin, Kevin Weisman, and Jonathan Silverman.

== Personal life ==
In 1992, Malina met costume designer Melissa Merwin through his friendship with her sister Jennifer, and Jennifer's then-husband, actor Timothy Busfield. Merwin converted to Judaism under Conservative auspices. They married in 1996 and have two children. Merwin filed for divorce in August 2024, citing "irreconcilable differences."

== Filmography ==
=== Film ===
Year	Title	Role	Notes
1992	A Few Good Men	Tom	
1993	In the Line of Fire	Secret Service Agent Chavez	
1993	Malice	Resident	
1995	Separate Lives	Randall	
1995	The American President	David	
1996	Infinity	Calculator Kid #3	
1997	Clockwatchers	Global Credit Receptionist	
1998	Bulworth	Bill Feldman	
1999	Kill the Man	Bob Stein	
2001	Without Charlie	Charlie	
2003	View from the Top	Randy Jones	
2012	The First Time	Mr. Miller	
2013	Knights of Badassdom	Travis	
2014	The Young Kieslowski	Robert Kieslowski	
2015	Thrilling Adventure Hour Live	Barkeep	
2016	Rules Don't Apply	Herb	Uncredited
2025	Ethan Bloom	Gary Bloomfield	

=== Television ===
Year	Title	Role	Notes
1993	Bob	Vince	Episode: "Da Game"
1993–1998	The Larry Sanders Show	Kenny Mitchell / Robert Brody	4 episodes
1994	Menendez: A Killing in Beverly Hills	Gerald Bronstein	TV movie
1996	Tracey Takes On...	Jordan	3 episodes
1996	Champs	Cab Driver	Episode: "Live and Let Breathe"
1996	Sliders	Egghead Announcer	Episode: "Rules of the Game"
1998	From the Earth to the Moon	Tim Messick	Episode: "We Have Cleared the Tower"
1998–2000	Sports Night	Jeremy Goodwin	45 episodes
2000	How to Marry a Billionaire: A Christmas Tale	Mark Sickler	TV movie
2002	She Spies	Jimmy Onassis	Episode: "First Episode"
2002	Imagine That	Kenny Fleck	6 episodes
2002–2006	The West Wing	Will Bailey	71 episodes
2003	See Jane Date	Kevin Adams	TV movie
2006–2007	Numb3rs	Howard Meeks	3 episodes
2006–2007	The Nine	Tim Marley	2 episodes
2007	Stargate SG-1	Cicero	Episode: "Bad Guys"
2007–2008	Big Shots	Karl Mixworthy	11 episodes
2008	Medium	Tim Carmer	Episode: "Car Trouble"
2008	Grey's Anatomy	Seth Hammer	Episode: "In the Midnight Hour"
2008	CSI: Crime Scene Investigation	DA Monroe	Episode: "Woulda, Coulda, Shoulda"
2009	Terminator: The Sarah Connor Chronicles	Agent Auldridge	Episode: "Born to Run"
2009	iCarly	Goldstein	Episode: "iTake on Dingo"
2009	Valentine	Duncan	Episode: "Hound Dog"
2009	Psych	Stewart Gimbley	Episode: "Let's Get Hairy"
2009	House M.D.	Tucker	Episode: "Wilson"
2009	Legally Mad	Aaron	Unaired pilot
2009–2011	In Plain Sight	Peter Alpert	17 episodes
2010	Bones	Dr. Adam Copeland	Episode: "The Devil in the Details"
2010	The Sarah Silverman Program	Supervisor Bill Wilson	Episode: "Nightmayor"
2010	The Good Guys	Assistant Chief James Guthrie	Episode: "Cop Killer"
2011	CSI: Miami	Neil Marshall	Episode: "G.O."
2011	Private Practice	Jason	Episode: "To Change The Things We Can"
2011	American Horror Story: Murder House	The Dentist	Episode: "Spooky Little Girl"
2011–2019	The Big Bang Theory	President Siebert	13 episodes
2012	Leap Year	Sam Berry	4 episodes
2012–2018	Scandal	David Rosen	112 episodes
2014	Law & Order: Special Victims Unit	Simon Wilkes	2 episodes
2014	Extant	Dr. Gavin Beck	Episode: "What on Earth Is Wrong?"
2015	Childrens Hospital	Gene	Episode: "We Are Not Our DNA!"
2017	Wet Hot American Summer: Ten Years Later	Deep Throat	3 episodes
2019	The Good Doctor	Mitchell Stewart	Episode: "Take My Hand"
2020	Perfect Harmony	Torsten VanBlaricum	Episode: "Know When to Walk Away"
2020	FBI: Most Wanted	Paul Hayden	Episode: "Silkworm"
2020–2021	Shameless	Arthur Tipping	5 episodes
2021	This Is Us	Car Crash Victim	Episode: "There"
2021	The Rookie	Max	Episode: "Life and Death"
2022	Inventing Anna	Henrick Knight	Episode: "The Devil Wore Anna"
2022–2023	American Auto	Ted	2 episodes
2025	Law & Order	Kevin Bradley	Episode: "Bend the Knee"
2026	Stuart Fails to Save the Universe	Captain Siebert	Episode: "Spoiler: We're as Confused as You Are"
