= Fred Weller =

American actor (born 1966)

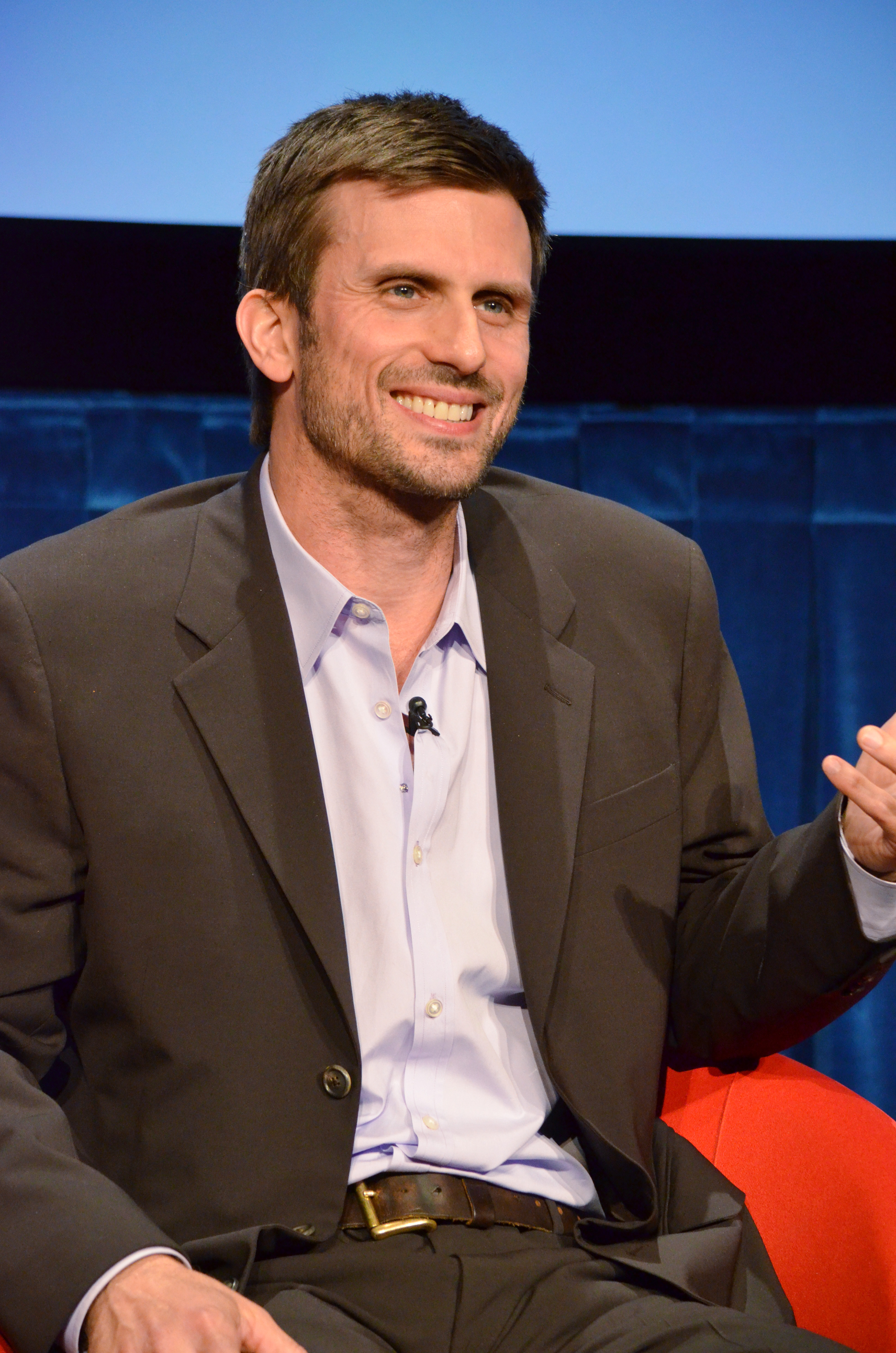
- Weller in April 2012
- Born: Frederick Breithoff Weller; April 18, 1966 (age 60); New Orleans, Louisiana, U.S.
- Education: University of North Carolina, Chapel Hill (BA); Juilliard School (GrDip)
- Occupation: Actor
- Years active: 1991–present
- Spouse: Ali Marsh (m. 2003)
- Children: 2

Frederick Breithoff Weller (born April 18, 1966) is an American actor known for portraying Johnny Sandowski on Missing Persons, Shane Mungitt in Take Me Out, Marshall Mann in In Plain Sight, and Declan Bode on Banshee.

== Early life and education ==
Weller was born in New Orleans, Louisiana, one of three sons of lawyers Carole Ann (née Breithoff) Weller (died 2017) and Francis Weller (1922–2018). He is a 1984 graduate of Jesuit High School, a Catholic all-boys high school in New Orleans. He graduated summa cum laude from the University of North Carolina at Chapel Hill in 1988. He then studied acting at The Juilliard School as a member of the Drama Division's Group 21 (1988–1992).

== Career ==
In 1993, Weller was one of the main regulars in the TV series Missing Persons. He has made guest appearances in episodes of Law & Order, Law & Order: Special Victims Unit, Law & Order: Criminal Intent, Monk and The Young Indiana Jones Chronicles. He has also appeared in several well-received films, such as Stonewall, The Business of Strangers, The Shape of Things, and the 2000 drama/miniseries The Beach Boys: An American Family portraying the character Brian Wilson. He starred in the USA Network comedy-drama series In Plain Sight as Deputy U.S. Marshal Marshall Mann.

He appeared on Broadway in 2003 in the Tony award-winning play Take Me Out in which he appeared completely nude, and in 2014 in the Terrence McNally play Mothers and Sons. In 2018, he appeared on Broadway as Bob Ewell in Aaron Sorkin's To Kill a Mockingbird, an adaptation of Harper Lee's novel.

Weller has played lead roles in many successful independent films, including Neil LaBute's The Shape of Things (with Paul Rudd, Rachel Weisz and Gretchen Mol), James Toback's When Will I Be Loved (opposite Neve Campbell) and The Business of Strangers (with Stockard Channing and Julia Stiles).

== Personal life ==
Weller married actress Ali Marsh on September 6, 2003. They have two children, a daughter born in 2007, whose godmother is his In Plain Sight co-star Mary McCormack, and a son born in 2010. He and his family live in the Greenwich Village neighborhood of New York City.

== Filmography ==
=== Film ===
Year	Title	Role	Notes
1991	Bugsy	Architect Assistant	Uncredited
1995	Stonewall	Matty Dean	Main character
1996	Basquiat	Frank	
1997	Hudson River Blues	Ron	
1998	How to Make the Cruelest Month	Rickey	
1998	Harvest	Bucky Upton	
1998	Armageddon	NASA Tech	
1999	Puppet	Rick	Main character (co-star). Puppet was never released to the general public
2001	The Business of Strangers	Nick Harris	Main character
2003	The Shape of Things	Philip	Main character
2003	The Pink House	Young Pritchard	
2004	When Will I Be Loved	Ford Welles	Main character
2005	Southern Belles	Tracy Hampton	
2005	Four Lane Highway	Sean	
2008	Life in Flight	Kit	
2009	Streetcar	Darko	Short; also writer and director
2009	Buffalo Bushido	Wendyl	
2012	The Normals	Lannigan	
2014	Bad Country	Detective Shepard	
2016	The Free World	Officer Ryan	
2016	The Fundamentals of Caring	Bob Richardson	
2018	BlacKkKlansman	Patrolman Andy Landers	
2022	Out of the Blue	Deputy Fox	
2022	Causeway	Rick	
2022	The Independent	Spencer Erickson	

=== Television ===
Year	Title	Role	Notes
1991	I'll Fly Away	Jimmy Yates	Episode: "I’ll Fly Away"
1993	Law & Order	Dan Garrett	Episode: "Promises to Keep"
1993	The Young Indiana Jones Chronicles	Eliot Ness	Episode: "Young Indiana Jones and the Mystery of the Blues"
1993–1994	Missing Persons	Investigator Johnny Sandowski	Main character (regular cast), all 17 episodes
1997	Gold Coast	Arnold Rapp	TV movie
1998	Dellaventura	Mark Matthews	Episode: "David & Goliath"
1999	Aftershock: Earthquake in New York	Nicholai Karvovsky	TV movie; main character
2000	The Beach Boys: An American Family	Brian Wilson	2 episodes
2000	Madigan Men	Sebastian James	Episode: "Bachelors"
2000	In the Beginning	Jacob	2 episodes
2003	Law & Order: Special Victims Unit	Preston Bennett	Episode: "Tortured"
2004	The Jury	Holden Bradford	Episode: "Memories"
2004–2007	Law & Order: Criminal Intent	Dale Mullen/Simon Harper II	2 episodes
2006	Related	Lucas	Episode: "The Move"
2006	Monk	Jay Bennett	Episode: "Mr. Monk, Private Eye"
2008–2012	In Plain Sight	Marshall Mann	Main character (co-star), all 61 episodes
2009	Wainy Days	Stosh	2 episodes
2010–2013	The Good Wife	Wilk Hobson	2 episodes
2011	Blue Bloods	Jacob Krystal	3 episodes
2012	Childrens Hospital	Elliot	Episode: "A Year in the Life"
2013	Alpha House	Digger Mancusi	Episode: "Zingers"
2014	The Michael J. Fox Show	Will	Episode: "Couples"
2014	Those Who Kill	Nathan Schaeffer	Episode: "Souvenirs"
2014	Person of Interest	Novak	Episode: "Panopticon"
2015	The Knick	Mr. Brockhurst	2 episodes
2015	Forever	Eddie Warsaw	Episode: "Punk Is Dead"
2016	Elementary	Ronnie Wright	Episode: "Ready or Not"
2016	Banshee	Declan Bode	4 episodes
2016	Bull	Pete Peters	Episode: "The Necklace"
2016	Conviction	Lewis Anderson	Episode: "Bridge and Tunnel Vision"
2017	The Blacklist	Joe Peracchio	Episode: "Philomena (No. 61)"
2017	Odd Mom Out	Dean	2 episodes
2018	Mosaic	Eric	9 episodes
2018	The Path	Remy	Episode: "The Door"
2019–2020	At Home with Amy Sedaris	Walter / Blaze	2 episodes
