= Witches of East End season 2 =

Witches of East End
- Season 2
- Promotional poster
- No. of episodes: 13

Release
- Original network: Lifetime
- Original release: July 6 – October 5, 2014

Season chronology
- ← Previous; Season 1

The second and final season of Witches of East End premiered on July 6, 2014, and concluded on October 5, 2014. It consisted of 13 episodes, each running 40–45 minutes approx. The series is based loosely on the book of the same by Melissa de la Cruz. The story takes place in East End focusing on a family of witches, led by Joanna Beauchamp (Julia Ormond). This season aired on Sundays at 9pm, followed by the new series The Lottery, and averaged 1.13 million viewers. On November 4, 2014, Lifetime cancelled Witches of East End due to low ratings in the second season.

== Cast and characters ==
=== Main cast ===
- Julia Ormond as Joanna Beauchamp
- Mädchen Amick as Wendy Beauchamp
- Jenna Dewan Tatum as Freya Beauchamp
- Rachel Boston as Ingrid Beauchamp
- Daniel Di Tomasso as Killian Gardiner/Edgar Allan Poe
- Christian Cooke as Frederick Beauchamp
- Eric Winter as Dash Gardiner

=== Recurring cast ===
- Ignacio Serricchio as Tommy Cole/Rey Nikolaus (11 episodes)
- Bianca Lawson as Eva/Selina (10 episodes)
- James Marsters as Mason Tarkoff (7 episodes)
- Anthony Konechny as the Mandragora (5 episodes)
- Steven Berkoff as Rey Nikolaus (5 episodes)
- Sarah Lancaster as Raven Moreau (4 episodes)
- Joel Gretsch as Victor (3 episodes)
- Shaun Smyth as Dr. Frank Foster (3 episodes)
- Michelle Hurd as Alex (2 episodes)
- Tom Lenk as Hudson Rafferty (2 episodes)

=== Guest cast ===
- Rachel Nichols as Isis Zurka (1 episode)
- Eddie McClintock as Ronan (1 episode)
- Callard Harris as Ivar Zurka (1 episode)

== Production ==
On November 22, 2013, Witches of East End was renewed by Lifetime for a 13-episode second season, which premiered on July 6, 2014. Christian Cooke joined this season as a series regular. James Marsters and Bianca Lawson guest starred this season, (Marsters guest starred as Tarkoff, an old friend of Joanna's; while Lawson played Eva, a mysterious woman who has a connection to Killian).

== Episodes ==
No. overall	No. in season	Title	Directed by	Written by	Original release date	Prod. code	U.S. viewers (millions)
11	1	"A Moveable Beast"	Allan Arkush	Maggie Friedman	July 6, 2014	2WAK01	1.12
One week after the portal to Asgard opened Joanna is still struggling with the Argentium poison. Freya worries about Killian's well being, but he turns up alive married to a mysterious woman named Eva. Ingrid develops a strange sleep walking habit and ends up feeding a beast. Wendy meets a guy at the library and they share close encounters. Dash investigates strange attacks in the woods. Joanna's son and Freya's twin Frederick arrives in East End and Wendy doesn't trust him. Frederick heals Joanna of the poison.
12	2	"The Son Also Rises"	Patrick Norris	Richard Hatem	July 13, 2014	2WAK02	1.50
The Beauchamp family gathers together to celebrate the Fourth of July. Joanna introduces Ingrid and Freya to their brother and they bond. Dash receives demands from his blackmailer of $50,000 as just a down payment. Dash continues to hallucinate about Killian. Frederick performs a mysterious spell on one of Wendy's earrings, and then gives it back. Wendy still has doubts about Frederick. Freya learns that she and Fredrick are twins and can perform strong spells and desperately uses the information to track down Killian. Killian begins gambling and almost gets shot after he wins but he uses magic to break the guy's hand. Eva performs a spell on Killian to see if he is a brujo and it reveals Killian is indeed a brujo. Wendy and Tommy grow closer. Ingrid announces that she is moving out.
13	3	"The Old Man and the Key"	Michael Nankin	Turi Meyer & Al Septien	July 20, 2014	2WAK03	1.31
Freya heads to Santo Domingo to track down Killian and is shocked when she finds him with Eva, his wife. Eva confronts Freya about her relationship with Killian but she explains that nothing ever happened with them. After learning his mother died Killian arrives back in East End. Dash tracks down his blackmailer and it leads to tragedy when he kills him. Ingrid comforts Dash over killing the man blackmailing him. Dash and Killian share a sweet reunion. Wendy, still concerned Frederick is up to something, performs a spell that enables her to follow him without his knowledge. Joanna tags along with Wendy and flashbacks reveal Frederick's ultimate betrayal. Victor arrives back home but is kidnapped. Joanna calls Victor, worried he isn't home, and on his phone his blood is shown dripping from his body.
14	4	"The Brothers Grimoire"	Ron Underwood	Shelley Meals & Darin Goldberg	July 27, 2014	2WAK04	1.10
Wendy and Tommy go through a disastrous series of meetings. Frederick's old friends, a pair of shape-shifting twins from Asgard return dead set on reclaiming the Asgard portal key. Frederick's friends are also revealed to be the one who kidnapped Victor and later kidnaps Freya as well. Frederick desperately tries to save Freya and Victor but Joanna tries to take things into her own hands. Frederick ends up killing the brother. Meanwhile, Joanna arrives at Freya and Victor's side and confronts the sister. In making her getaway, she entraps Freya in a magical booby trap and it is revealed that if Freya moves the whole place will be blown up. Victor convinces Joanna to perform a spell to switch places with Freya. Joanna reluctantly performs the spell sealing his fate. The whole place is blown up and Victor is presumed dead. Dash and Killian find their family Grimoire and Dash performs a spell that accidentally absorbs Killian's life force and vitality. Dash calls Ingrid for help but she sleep walks into the woods again to feed the beast. Ingrid later talks Dash and Killian through in undoing the spell and they are successful. Killian survives and Ingrid and Dash grow closer. Killian arrives at the bar and Freya cries in his arms about Victor's death. When Frederick learns about his father's death he tries to comfort Joanna but she turns him away. Later that night Frederick in a hoodie bumps into a man and knocks his phone on the ground. When the guy lifts up he is sucked forward and the beast kills him, hinting that Frederick might be the beast.
15	5	"Boogie Knights"	Debbie Allen	Debra J. Fisher	August 10, 2014	2WAK05	0.96
Freya relives one of her past lives with Killian, and comes to realize that though something seems right it isn't always whats best. She then gives Killian her approval of his new marriage. Eva then puts something mysterious in Killian's drink. Joanna asks her old friend Alex for help to stop the dark being which has been killing innocent people which has been revealed to be a Mandragora. After Frederick has a seizure Wendy begins to see him in a new light. Alex reveals to Wendy that she knows she has her guard up when it comes to Tommy and getting hurt again. Dash performs a spell on one of his patients unaware of the deadly consequences. Ingrid helps Dash deal with his new problem and they continue to grow closer. Dash helps Ingrid with her sleeping walking habit. Joanna and Alex's past is revealed and they share a kiss. New mythology of the Mandragora is revealed. Alex attempts to kill Mandragora but before she can Joanna realizes that Ingrid is the Mandragora's mate and if he dies Ingrid does as well. Ingrid becomes possessed and attacks Dash. The Mandragora then appears and begins feeding on Dash. Joanna and Alex arrive at Fair Haven and find Ingrid in the arms of the Mandragora. Before Joanna can save Ingrid the Mandragora and Ingrid disappear.
16	6	"When a Mandragora Loves a Woman"	Joe Dante	Akela Cooper	August 17, 2014	2WAK06	1.15
Joanna and Alex try to put their past aside to focus on finding the Mandragora. Meanwhile, Freya asks Dash to help save Ingrid; Wendy becomes wary of Frederick's loyalty when she sees him performing a spell on one of the Mandragora's victims. In the end, Frederick is the one who kills the Madragora but suffers another seizure. Killian is able to hear peoples' thoughts while at the bar and tries to shut it out by spending time with Eva and telling her that he has never been able to read her mind.
17	7	"Art of Darkness"	Patrick Norris	Yolonda E. Lawrence	August 24, 2014	2WAK07	1.02
Tarkoff, an old friend of the family, visits Joanna and Frederick. Tarkoff wants Frederick to poison Joanna as she is too dangerous and smart. Meanwhile, Wendy, Freya, Ingrid and Dash attend an art gala where Wendy encounters someone from her past. After Dash being possessed in the previous episode, Freya has started doubting him and doesn't trust him anymore. When she relays these feelings to Ingrid, they end up having an argument. Dash is approached by Mr. Hutton at the gala and they have a tense conversation about Hutton's missing son. Dash follows him out to try and convince Hutton that he has nothing to do with his son's disappearance but ends up killing the man. Killian begins to doubt his feelings for Eva, and sees her briefly as an old woman. He confronts her but is unprepared for the backlash. It is revealed that Eva has actually been charming Killian into falling in love with her while he actually loves Freya.
18	8	"Sex, Lies, and Birthday Cake"	Guy Norman Bee	Story by : Sarah Tarkoff; Teleplay by : Maggie Friedman & Richard Hatem	September 7, 2014	2WAK08	1.08
Freya and Frederick celebrate a milestone birthday. Tarkoff puts pressure on Frederick to get things done. Since he can't kill Frederick (who is the King's vessel) and Frederick has clearly underestimated Tarkoff's powers, Tarkoff tells him that he needs to find someone he can trust and make that person the King's vessel. He indicates to Frederick that the person is Frederick's girlfriend Caroline. Frederick almost completes the ritual with Caroline but backs out at the last minute. Tarkoff spends time with Joanna and confesses to her that she was his first love. Meanwhile, Killian's feelings for Freya surface and he tells her that he loves only her. They sleep together despite Freya telling him that they've met in past lives and it doesn't end well. Killian says that he wants to start a life with Freya and prepares to come clean to Eva the same night. He asks Freya to meet him at the bar at midnight only to meet her hours later and say that them sleeping together was a mistake. It is also revealed that Eva's grandmother is actually her daughter and is unwell. Ingrid and Dash grow closer and Ingrid chances upon a video at Dash's home that Kyle Hutton's murder was not an accident. She confronts Dash and leaves his house in anger. Tommy gets a surprise from Wendy who tells him she's a witch and then must deal with the consequences of telling a mortal. Joanna faces one of her worst fears.
19	9	"Smells Like King Spirit"	Tim Andrew	Turi Meyer & Al Septien	September 14, 2014	2WAK09	1.20
Tarkoff seeks revenge against Frederick for having not completed the ritual with Caroline. Frederick tells him he will no longer take orders from him at which point Tarkoff angrily tells him that he will now take matters into his own hands. Injured after being attacked by Tarkoff, Frederick finally shares Tarkoff's and the King's plans with Joanna and Wendy and tells them that the King's (his grandfather's) mind and magic are as strong as ever but his body is weak and Tarkoff has been looking for a body for the King to inhabit. The three of them devise a scheme to lure Tarkoff and get to know his plans by using Death Scorpions. Freya and Frederick are to use their Twin Magic to find Tarkoff, something that Frederick has his reservations about as it could be dangerous. They find Tarkoff holding Tommy hostage, ready to make him the new vessel. Listening to Tarkoff, Freya realizes that Frederick has been the vessel all this while Joanna launches the Death Scorpion on Frederick and he tells them what his original plan was but that he couldn't go through with it. Freya discusses her night with Killian with Ingrid and tells her that she suspects Eva is playing with his mind. Freya secretly visits Eva's house and finds ingredients used for making a potion for controlling the mind. She confronts Killian and they go to meet Eva who is now an old woman. She tells Killian that she needed to be pregnant by a warlock before her previous child (her supposed grandmother) dies in order for Eva to remain young and powerful but she didn't make it. She also tells him that she charmed him to fall in love with her so that her plan would work. Freya tries to do something for her but Eva dies in Killian's arms. Killian and Freya make up. Ingrid gives Dash an ultimatum to sort things out for himself which would mean that it wouldn't be possible for him and her to be with each other.
20	10	"The Fall of the House of Beauchamp"	Mick Garris	Darin Goldberg & Shelley Meals	September 21, 2014	2WAK10	1.24
Still reeling from Freya and Ingrid's murder, a devastated Joanna retreats to her bedroom, unable to face the reality that she's once again had to watch them die and that the cycle will only repeat itself. Worried about her sister's state of mind, Wendy is determined to bring them back, but knows the dangers of the spells all too well... and is forced to partner with the enemy. Meanwhile, Killian makes a startling discovery, and Dash's secrets begin to surface.
21	11	"Poe Way Out"	Joe Dante	Debra J. Fisher	September 28, 2014	2WAK11	0.88
Joanna, Freya and Wendy revisit one of their past lives and find themselves in the year 1848 in Baltimore. Ingrid remains to spend some time with her grandfather and tells him though she hasn't made a decision, she feels lost and wants to find more about herself. Ingrid decides to go back to Asgard with her grandfather to find out more about where she came from but then visits Dash and asks for his help. Ingrid tells him that she believes her grandfather is faking being ill and while Joanna, Wendy and Freya are in hiding, Ingrid after winning her grandfather's confidence intends to stop him from doing whatever he is planning. Joanna, Wendy and Freya go to an opium den where they see their past selves. Joanna tells Freya that in past life Freya and Edgar Allan Poe were lovers and Freya broke the code by telling him, a mortal, that she was a witch. Joanna tells Freya that she needs to procure a weapon (the Anima Aucupe) at midnight from her past self so she can use it to send her father straight back to Hell. Dash's one-night stand is revealed as the new detective, Raven, who is investigating murders in Fair Haven. Dash tries to mess up the investigation but it may already be too late. Killian tries to reverse the opposition of the stars to his and Freya's love story but may have to pay with his life for the spell to work.
22	12	"Box to the Future"	Andy Wolk	Richard Hatem	October 5, 2014	2WAK12	1.14
Frederick is suspicious of Ingrid's decision to go to Asgard. He tells his grandfather about how close she is to Dash and though Dash doesn't remember much of his past life as Bastian, it may not be safe to think she's on their side. Frederick's grandfather, Nikolaus, transforms into Tommy and pays Dash a visit and threatens him to stay away from Ingrid. He tells Dash that if Dash stays away, Nikolaus can reward him in a previous life. Ingrid is worried when Dash tells her this but he promises her he's on her side. She tells him that they need to reconstitute the journal they had burnt but is forced to leave them at Dash's place, even though she doesn't trust the power of the books with him, to avoid being detected by Nikolaus. Detective Ravevn finds out about Fair Haven's history of housing witches and carrying out occult practices. Hot on the heels of Dash, she pays him a visit and they sleep together. Dash wakes up to find that Raven has made it away with the journal Ingrid had restored. Nikolaus confronts Ingrid and holds her captive, concealed from Frederick. Killian has consumed a poison to kill himself and reunite with Freya. He calls Ingrid and tells her about a dream in which Freya tried to give him the root of a lotus. Ingrid gives him the lotus root and asks him to drink it every fifteen minutes to slow down the effect of whatever he has consumed. Killian hallucinates Freya who keeps asking him to stay alive and wait for her though he is growing increasingly weak. Joanna is able to procure the weapon from her past self but is followed by Tarkoff who has been sent by Nikolaus. Tarkoff proposes to Joanna to join him and beat the King together. Tarkoff abducts Joanna and starts injecting her with opium. Meanwhile Freya and Wendy are forced to go back to the opium den where they have left the magic key to the time door. The key is now with the Wendy in the past. Freya recognizes Edgar Allan Poe as having the same soul as that of Killian and enlists his help to get the key back or it may be too late for them to return.
23	13	"For Whom the Spell Tolls"	Allan Arkush	Maggie Friedman	October 5, 2014	2WAK13	1.03
Frederick realizes that Nikolaus has been lying to them all along and only wants the power of all his family members. He and Dash is able to free Ingrid from Nikolaus' clutches but Nikolaus has already taken Ingrid's powers. He tells her about Detective Raven having confiscated a lot of stuff that may incriminate him but he affirms that he would keep Ingrid completely out of it. Frederick joins forces with Indgrid and Dash and starts going through all the information in Dash's mind to help find a spell that may help them stop Nikolaus. In 1848-Baltimore, Joanna is being held by Tarkoff and is kept heavily sedated under the influence of opium. Freya and Wendy are finally able to find her. Wendy (being a cat and thus undetected by telepath Tarkoff) attacks him and injects Tarkoff with his own opium. Wendy and Freya are able to send a message to present day Ingrid via a messenger who has been carrying the message for 166 years. Ingrid is able to open the time door for her family just in time, even as Tarkoff pursues them. The Beauchamps are reunited but immediately Wendy is taken. Nikolaus (as Tommy) has her under his control and plans to kill his family one by one after taking their powers. Meanwhile, Detective Raven is able to book Dash for the murder of Kyle Hutton and arrests him. Frederick affirms his loyalty to his mother and sisters and all of them come to Nikolaus and attack him. Wendy is sad about Tommy's death and blames herself. Ingrid and Freya rush to find Killian who they think is dead but he comes back to life as Freya kisses him. As Joanna tries calling Frederick, a shot shows him dead at the Beauchamps' house with the words 'Death to Witches' written near his body with blood. While Joanna is making the phone call, Wendy performs a spell and transfers her last life to Tommy and dies. Ingrid gets a call informing her of Dash's arrest. Killian goes to meet Dash where Dash reads a spell and exchanges souls with Killian leaving Killian in Dash's body in prison and heads home with Freya. Wendy wakes up in Underworld and meets Helena Beauchamp.

== Ratings ==
=== U.S. ratings ===
No.	Episode	Air date	Time slot (EST)	Rating/Share (18–49)	Viewers (m)
1	"A Moveable Beast"	July 6, 2014	Sunday; 9:00 P.M.	0.5	1.12
2	"The Son Also Rises"	July 13, 2014	Sunday; 9:00 P.M.	0.6	1.50
3	"The Old Man and the Key"	July 20, 2014	Sunday; 9:00 P.M.	0.5	1.31
4	"The Brothers Grimoire"	July 27, 2014	Sunday; 9:00 P.M.	0.5	1.10
5	"Boogie Knights"	August 10, 2014	Sunday; 9:00 P.M.	0.4	0.96
6	"When a Mandragora Loves a Woman"	August 17, 2014	Sunday; 9:00 P.M.	0.5	1.15
7	"Art of Darkness"	August 24, 2014	Sunday; 9:00 P.M.	0.5	1.02
8	"Sex, Lies, and Birthday Cake"	September 7, 2014	Sunday; 9:00 P.M.	0.5	1.08
9	"Smells Like King Spirit"	September 14, 2014	Sunday; 9:00 P.M.	0.5	1.20
10	"The Fall of the House of Beauchamp"	September 21, 2014	Sunday; 9:00 P.M.	0.5	1.24
11	"Poe Way Out"	September 28, 2014	Sunday; 9:00 P.M.	0.4	0.88
12	"Box to the Future"	October 5, 2014	Sunday; 9:00 P.M.	0.5	1.14
13	"For Whom the Spell Tolls"	October 5, 2014	Sunday; 10:00 P.M.	0.4	1.03
