= Witches of East End season 1 =

Witches of East End
- Season 1
- Region 1 DVD cover
- No. of episodes: 10

Release
- Original network: Lifetime
- Original release: October 6 – December 15, 2013

Season chronology
- Next → Season 2

The first season of Witches of East End premiered on October 6, 2013, and concluded on December 15, 2013. It consisted of 10 episodes, each running 40–45 minutes approx. The series is based loosely on the book of the same name by Melissa de la Cruz. The story takes place in East End focusing on a family of witches, led by Joanna Beauchamp (Julia Ormond). This season aired on Sundays at 10pm, following the fifth season of Drop Dead Diva, and averaged 1.67 million viewers.

== Cast and characters ==
=== Main cast ===
- Julia Ormond as Joanna Beauchamp
- Mädchen Amick as Wendy Beauchamp (Guest in episode 1, starring from episode 2 onwards)
- Jenna Dewan Tatum as Freya Beauchamp
- Rachel Boston as Ingrid Beauchamp
- Daniel Di Tomasso as Killian Gardiner
- Eric Winter as Dash Gardiner

=== Recurring cast ===
- Virginia Madsen as Penelope Gardiner / Athena Browning (8 episodes)
- Jason George as Adam Noble (5 episodes)
- Tiya Sircar as Amy Matthews (4 episodes)
- Enver Gjokaj as Mike (4 episodes)
- Anthony Lemke as Harrison Welles (3 episodes)
- Tom Lenk as Hudson Rafferty (3 episodes)
- Gillian Barber as Maura Thatcher (3 episodes)
- Kellee Stewart as Barb (3 episodes)

=== Guest cast ===
- Neil Hopkins as Doug (2 episodes)
- Matt Frewer as Vidar (2 episodes)
- Freddie Prinze Jr. as Leo Wingate (2 episodes)
- Joel Gretsch as Victor (2 episodes)
- Kaitlin Doubleday as Elyse (1 episode)
- Matthew Del Negro as Archibald Browning (1 episode)

== Episodes ==
No. overall	No. in season	Title	Directed by	Written by	Original release date	Prod. code	U.S. viewers (millions)
1	1	"Pilot"	Mark Waters	Teleplay by : Maggie Friedman	October 6, 2013	1WAK79	1.93
The Beauchamp family is greeted by their relative, Wendy, around the time an old couple is mysteriously attacked. The woman survives and identifies her attacker as Joanna Beauchamp. Ingrid and Freya, Joanna's unsuspecting daughters, learn their true identities when an old boyfriend of Freya's past-life turns up and plans to kill her.
2	2	"Marilyn Fenwick, R.I.P."	Jonathan Kaplan	Maggie Friedman	October 13, 2013	1WAK01	1.93
Ingrid casts a spell to bring a dead Wendy back to life, not knowing the price until afterwards - to save someone you love, someone you love has to die. Joanna is arrested for homicide. Ingrid and Wendy go to save Freya, but accidentally release Freya's ex-boyfriend, who then lures Freya into the bathroom and attempts to drown her.
3	3	"Today I Am a Witch"	Allan Arkush	Josh Reims	October 20, 2013	1WAK02	1.69
Wendy teaches Freya and Ingrid magic while Joanna faces her own troubles. Meanwhile, Ingrid attempts to counter the resurrection spell she used to bring back Wendy with a new spell of her own, but ends up putting her own life in danger. Freya has trouble controlling her magic and her feelings for her fiancé's brother, Killian.
4	4	"A Few Good Talismen"	Fred Gerber	Turi Meyer & Al Septien	October 27, 2013	1WAK03	1.83
Ingrid struggles with her feelings toward Adam. Wendy goes to seduce a man, Leo Wingate to steal an unusual butterfly specimen and then uses it on Maura Thatcher, the lady who survived and pressed charges against Joanna. Freya uses a beacon spell to gather Dash and Killian for a dinner evening, but it doesn't go as well as she hopes. Ingrid gives in to her feelings for Adam moments before the curse kills him.
5	5	"Electric Avenue"	Paul Holahan	Ron Milbauer & Terri Hughes-Burton	November 3, 2013	1WAK04	1.60
Joanna witnesses Maura Thatcher's loss of mental stability caused by Wendy's spell. Ingrid summons Adam's spirit and accidentally allows a spirit from Dash and Killian's past to cross through and look them up for trouble. Killian gets electrocuted and winds up in the hospital.
6	6	"Potentia Noctis"	John Scott	Maggie Friedman	November 10, 2013	1WAK05	1.46
Freya finds a weird organic branch created by dark magic. Wendy sees it and immediately tells her its danger. To save herself and Dash, who had also touched the object, she organizes a get-together with him and his brother. She eventually comes across an entire wall of these branches. Meanwhile, Ingrid finds a photo of her past life and uses a spell to recover her memory, and what she learns proves more disturbing than she had bargained for.
7	7	"Unburied"	David Solomon	Josh Reims	November 17, 2013	1WAK06	1.62
Ingrid is struggling to deal with her freshly recovered memories and avoids Wendy. The Shifter resurrects a dead, corrupted Ingrid and asks her to retrieve a snake shaped key in exchange for the opportunity to get revenge on the one who killed her - Wendy. As present Ingrid begins to uncover her part of the family curse, Joanna tells her to live as best as she can and Wendy decides to follow the same advice so she meets with Leo again before being captured by the undead Ingrid and is subsequently tortured and killed until Joanna finds them and turns the reanimated Ingrid to dirt. Freya's spell to stop her dreams of Killian apparently succeeds and Joanna realizes that Wendy is now on her last life.
8	8	"Snake Eyes"	Peter Leto	Al Septien & Turi Meyer	November 24, 2013	1WAK07	1.51
While Freya contemplates her Tarot reading, the Shifter casts a nasty spell on her and steals her powers. Joanna reveals the Serpent's Clavum to Wendy, who begs her to destroy it, but ultimately falls victim to its allure, causing her to come to literal and verbal blows with Joanna. Ingrid becomes increasingly interested in Mike, who displays a deep-seated desire to fulfill his father's work and finding the door to Asgard.
9	9	"A Parching Imbued"	Patrick Norris	Josh Reims	December 1, 2013	1WAK08	1.40
After a failed attempt to restore Freya's powers, the Beauchamp women deduce that it was, in fact, the Shifter who took them, and cast a tracking spell, but once again the Shifter is one step ahead of them. Against Joanna's wishes, Wendy seeks out the help of Victor, Freya and Ingrid's estranged father to help Freya. On the eve of Freya and Dash's wedding, Killian decides to leave East End. Mike goes to extremes to prove his theory that Ingrid is a witch, and later makes a startling revelation. Freya warms up to Victor, much to the chagrin of Ingrid and Joanna. Dash discovers the liquid pouring from the wall in the Fairhaven cellar. Freya receives a visitor who has some interesting things to say.
10	10	"Oh, What a World!"	John Scott	Maggie Friedman	December 15, 2013	1WAK09	1.74
It's the day of Dash and Freya's wedding, and bad omens are in abundance. Ingrid realizes a little too late just how dangerous obsession can be. Joanna finally figures out who the Shifter is, who in turn, leads her into a deadly trap. Victor shares some vital information with Freya about her past that makes her seriously doubt her imminent wedding, and she finally makes her decision. As three people regain their power, a door opens in Fairhaven that should better have stayed closed.

== Ratings ==
=== U.S. ratings ===
No.	Episode	Air date	Time slot (EST)	Rating/Share (18–49)	Viewers (m)
1	"Pilot"	October 6, 2013	Sunday; 10:00 P.M.	0.7	1.93
2	"Marilyn Fenwick, R.I.P."	October 13, 2013	Sunday; 10:00 P.M.	0.8	1.93
3	"Today I Am a Witch"	October 20, 2013	Sunday; 10:00 P.M.	0.6	1.69
4	"A Few Good Talismen"	October 27, 2013	Sunday; 10:00 P.M.	0.7	1.83
5	"Electric Avenue"	November 3, 2013	Sunday; 10:00 P.M.	0.7	1.60
6	"Potentia Noctis"	November 10, 2013	Sunday; 10:00 P.M.	0.6	1.46
7	"Unburied"	November 17, 2013	Sunday; 10:00 P.M.	0.5	1.62
8	"Snake Eyes"	November 24, 2013	Sunday; 10:00 P.M.	0.6	1.51
9	"A Parching Imbued"	December 1, 2013	Sunday; 10:00 P.M.	0.5	1.40
10	"Oh, What a World!"	December 15, 2013	Sunday; 10:00 P.M.	0.6	1.74

=== U.K. ratings ===
All ratings are taken from the UK source of television figures, BARB.

No.	Episode	Air date	Time slot (EST)	Viewers Lifetime	Viewers Lifetime+1	Total viewers	Weekly rank on Lifetime
1	"Pilot"	November 5, 2013	Tuesday; 10:00 P.M.	282,000	49,000	331,000	#1
2	"Marilyn Fenwick, R.I.P."	November 12, 2013	Tuesday; 10:00 P.M.	499,000	72,000	571,000	#1
3	"Today I Am a Witch"	November 19, 2013	Tuesday; 10:00 P.M.	193,000	19,000	212,000	#1
4	"A Few Good Talismen"	November 26, 2013	Tuesday; 10:00 P.M.	204,000	38,000	242,000	#1
5	"Electric Avenue"	December 3, 2013	Tuesday; 10:00 P.M.	238,000	38,000	276,000	#1
6	"Potentia Noctis"	December 10, 2013	Tuesday; 10:00 P.M.	303,000	54,000	357,000	#1
7	"Unburied"	December 17, 2013	Tuesday; 10:00 P.M.	266,000	50,000	316,000	#1
8	"Snake Eyes"	January 7, 2014	Tuesday; 10:00 P.M.	210,000	29,000	239,000	#2
9	"A Parching Imbued"	January 14, 2014	Tuesday; 10:00 P.M.	259,000	23,000	282,000	#1
10	"Oh, What a World!"	January 21, 2014	Tuesday; 10:00 P.M.	267,000	16,000	283,000	#2
