= List of Witches of East End episodes =

Witches of East End is an American television series loosely based on the book series of the same name by Melissa de la Cruz and developed by Maggie Friedman. In the United States, it premiered on Lifetime on October 6, 2013 and ended on October 5, 2014, with 23 episodes. Witches of East End follows the lives of a family of witches – Joanna Beauchamp (Julia Ormond) and her two grown-up daughters, Freya Beauchamp (Jenna Dewan Tatum) and Ingrid Beauchamp (Rachel Boston), as well as her sister Wendy Beauchamp (Mädchen Amick).

For its first season, Witches of East End aired on Sunday nights at 10:00 pm and averaged 1.67 million viewers. For its second season, the show moved up to the 9:00 pm timeslot on Sundays and averaged 1.13 million viewers. On November 4, 2014, Lifetime cancelled Witches of East End due to low ratings in the second season.

== Series overview ==
| Season | Episodes | Originally released | |
| Season | Episodes | First released | Last released |
|---|---|---|---|
| 1 | 10 | October 6, 2013 | December 15, 2013 |
| 2 | 13 | July 6, 2014 | October 5, 2014 |

== Episodes ==
=== Season 1 (2013) ===
| No. overall | No. in season | Title | Directed by | Written by | Original release date | Prod. code | U.S. viewers (millions) |
|---|---|---|---|---|---|---|---|
| 1 | 1 | "Pilot" | Mark Waters | Teleplay by : Maggie Friedman | October 6, 2013 | 1WAK79 | 1.93 |
| 2 | 2 | "Marilyn Fenwick, R.I.P." | Jonathan Kaplan | Maggie Friedman | October 13, 2013 | 1WAK01 | 1.93 |
| 3 | 3 | "Today I Am a Witch" | Allan Arkush | Josh Reims | October 20, 2013 | 1WAK02 | 1.69 |
| 4 | 4 | "A Few Good Talismen" | Fred Gerber | Turi Meyer & Al Septien | October 27, 2013 | 1WAK03 | 1.83 |
| 5 | 5 | "Electric Avenue" | Paul Holahan | Ron Milbauer & Terri Hughes-Burton | November 3, 2013 | 1WAK04 | 1.60 |
| 6 | 6 | "Potentia Noctis" | John Scott | Maggie Friedman | November 10, 2013 | 1WAK05 | 1.46 |
| 7 | 7 | "Unburied" | David Solomon | Josh Reims | November 17, 2013 | 1WAK06 | 1.62 |
| 8 | 8 | "Snake Eyes" | Peter Leto | Al Septien & Turi Meyer | November 24, 2013 | 1WAK07 | 1.51 |
| 9 | 9 | "A Parching Imbued" | Patrick Norris | Josh Reims | December 1, 2013 | 1WAK08 | 1.40 |
| 10 | 10 | "Oh, What a World!" | John Scott | Maggie Friedman | December 15, 2013 | 1WAK09 | 1.74 |

=== Season 2 (2014) ===
| No. overall | No. in season | Title | Directed by | Written by | Original release date | Prod. code | U.S. viewers (millions) |
|---|---|---|---|---|---|---|---|
| 11 | 1 | "A Moveable Beast" | Allan Arkush | Maggie Friedman | July 6, 2014 | 2WAK01 | 1.12 |
| 12 | 2 | "The Son Also Rises" | Patrick Norris | Richard Hatem | July 13, 2014 | 2WAK02 | 1.50 |
| 13 | 3 | "The Old Man and the Key" | Michael Nankin | Turi Meyer & Al Septien | July 20, 2014 | 2WAK03 | 1.31 |
| 14 | 4 | "The Brothers Grimoire" | Ron Underwood | Shelley Meals & Darin Goldberg | July 27, 2014 | 2WAK04 | 1.10 |
| 15 | 5 | "Boogie Knights" | Debbie Allen | Debra J. Fisher | August 10, 2014 | 2WAK05 | 0.96 |
| 16 | 6 | "When a Mandragora Loves a Woman" | Joe Dante | Akela Cooper | August 17, 2014 | 2WAK06 | 1.15 |
| 17 | 7 | "Art of Darkness" | Patrick Norris | Yolonda E. Lawrence | August 24, 2014 | 2WAK07 | 1.02 |
| 18 | 8 | "Sex, Lies, and Birthday Cake" | Guy Norman Bee | Story by : Sarah Tarkoff; Teleplay by : Maggie Friedman & Richard Hatem | September 7, 2014 | 2WAK08 | 1.08 |
| 19 | 9 | "Smells Like King Spirit" | Tim Andrew | Turi Meyer & Al Septien | September 14, 2014 | 2WAK09 | 1.20 |
| 20 | 10 | "The Fall of the House of Beauchamp" | Mick Garris | Darin Goldberg & Shelley Meals | September 21, 2014 | 2WAK10 | 1.24 |
| 21 | 11 | "Poe Way Out" | Joe Dante | Debra J. Fisher | September 28, 2014 | 2WAK11 | 0.88 |
| 22 | 12 | "Box to the Future" | Andy Wolk | Richard Hatem | October 5, 2014 | 2WAK12 | 1.14 |
| 23 | 13 | "For Whom the Spell Tolls" | Allan Arkush | Maggie Friedman | October 5, 2014 | 2WAK13 | 1.03 |

== DVD releases ==
| Season | Episodes | DVD release date | | |
| Season | Episodes | Region 1 | Region 2 | Region 4 |
|---|---|---|---|---|
| 1 | 10 | June 24, 2014 | October 27, 2014 | December 10, 2014 |
| 2 | 13 | July 7, 2015 | TBA | September 16, 2015 |
