= Eastwick (TV series) =

- Genre: Comedy drama; Fantasy; Supernatural
- Based on: The Witches of Eastwick by John Updike
- Developed by: Maggie Friedman
- Starring: Ashley Benson; Jon Bernthal; Veronica Cartwright; Jaime Ray Newman; Lindsay Price; Rebecca Romijn; Sara Rue; Johann Urb; Paul Gross
- Composer: Blake Neely
- Country of origin: United States
- Original language: English
- No. of seasons: 1
- No. of episodes: 13 (2 unaired)

Production
- Executive producers: Maggie Friedman; Marc David Alpert
- Running time: 42 minutes
- Production companies: Curly Girly Productions; Warner Bros. Television

Original release
- Network: ABC
- Release: September 23, 2009 – February 14, 2010

Eastwick is an American fantasy comedy-drama television series based on John Updike's 1984 novel The Witches of Eastwick which aired on ABC from September 23, 2009 until February 14, 2010. The series was developed by Maggie Friedman, and starred Paul Gross as Darryl Van Horne, alongside Jaime Ray Newman, Lindsay Price, and Rebecca Romijn as the eponymous witches.

== Plot ==
Joanna Frankel, Katherine Gardener, and Roxanne Torcoletti were three dissatisfied women living in the picturesque town of Eastwick, New England. Yearning for excitement in their lives, each of the women desperately make a wish for "something to change", in their daily lives. The following day, a mysterious and very secretive stranger named Darryl Van Horne arrives and begins courting each of the women in turn. Darryl eventually informs the women about their 'witch' talents and encourages them to explore their unique abilities. However, as the series progresses, the three unlikely friends begin to worry about Darryl's ultimate intentions.

== Cast ==
=== Primary characters ===
- Katherine "Kat" Gardener (Jaime Ray Newman) is a level-headed mother of five children, a nurse at Eastwick General Hospital, and the wife of Raymond Gardener. Struggling to balance a happy and healthy life and marriage, Kat is often compared to Mother Nature. Coincidentally, Kat exhibits the power of elementalism, otherwise known as the manipulation and control of the elements; air, earth, fire, water, lightning, and the manipulation of weather itself. As the show progressed, Kat also showed signs of healing abilities, as she was able to magically heal the injuries of her hospital patients. Her counterpart from the book is Sukie Rougemont.
- Joanna Frankel (Lindsay Price) is an insecure news reporter at the Eastwick Gazette. Although Joanna finds it difficult to have the things she wants, she ironically exhibits the hypnotic ability to control and manipulate the minds of men. As the show progressed, Joanna also showed signs of telekinetic powers and was able to move multiple objects with a simple thought. Her counterpart from the book is Jane Smart.
- Roxanne "Roxie" Torcoletti (Rebecca Romijn) is a free-spirited sculptor and also the widowed mother of Mia Torcoletti. As a widow, Roxie is seen as an outcast, largely because many of the Eastwick citizens believe she was responsible for her husband’s death. Throughout the series, Roxie exhibits clairvoyant powers, allowing her to hear and see deceased people, hear others' thoughts, and envision events that can (and most of the time will) happen. As the show progresses Roxie's clairvoyant abilities also allow her to hear her mother's inner, secret thoughts. Her counterpart from the book is Lexa Spofford.

=== Main ===
- Ashley Benson as Mia Torcoletti
- Jon Bernthal as Raymond Gardener
- Veronica Cartwright as Bun Waverly
- Jaime Ray Newman as Kat Gardener
- Lindsay Price as Joanna Frankel
- Rebecca Romijn as Roxanne Torcoletti
- Sara Rue as Penny Higgins
- Johann Urb as Will St. David
- Paul Gross as Darryl Van Horne

=== Recurring ===
- Darren Criss as Josh Burton
- Matt Dallas as Chad Burton
- Jason George as Max Brody
- Jack Huston as Jamie Dalton
- Cybill Shepherd as Eleanor Rougement
- Torsten Voges as Fidel

== Episodes ==
No.	Title	Directed by	Written by	Original release date	Prod. code	US viewers (millions)
1	"Pilot"	David Nutter	Story by : Michael Cristofer; Teleplay by : Maggie Friedman	September 23, 2009	276050	8.53
2	"Reaping and Sewing"	David Nutter	Maggie Friedman	September 30, 2009	3X5651	6.57
3	"Madams and Madames"	Michael Katleman	David S. Rosenthal	October 7, 2009	3X5652	5.28
4	"Fleas and Casserole"	Elodie Keene	Rina Mimoun	October 14, 2009	3X5653	5.09
5	"Mooning and Crooning"	Bill D'Elia	Chris Dingess	October 21, 2009	3X5654	4.93
6	"Bonfire and Betrayal"	Dan Lerner	Maggie Friedman & Rina Mimoun	October 28, 2009	3X5655	5.02
7	"Red Ants and Black Widows"	Tom Verica	Nancy Won	November 4, 2009	3X5656	4.60
8	"Paint and Pleasure"	John Terlesky	Annie Weisman	November 25, 2009	3X5657	3.89
9	"Tasers and Mind Erasers"	Fred Gerber	David S. Rosenthal	December 2, 2009	3X5658	4.25
10	"Tea and Psychopathy"	Michael Katleman	Maggie Friedman	December 16, 2009	3X5659	3.69
11	"Magic Snow and Creepy Gene"	Wendey Stanzler	Rina Mimoun	December 30, 2009	3X5661	3.26
12	"Red Bath and Beyond"	Kevin Rodney Sullivan	Wendy Mericle	January 19, 2010	3X5660	N/A
13	"Pampered and Tampered"	Michael Katleman	Story by : Nancy Won; Teleplay by : Maggie Friedman	February 14, 2010	3X5662	N/A

== Production ==
=== Previous versions ===
Before Eastwick, two other television adaptations of the original film were produced, but neither of these were picked up for full seasons. The first adaptation was produced for NBC in 1992, starring Julia Campbell as Jane Hollis, Catherine Mary Stewart as Sukie Ridgemont, Ally Walker as Alexandra Spofford, and Michael Siberry as Darryl Van Horne.

The second unsold pilot was produced for Fox in 2002, starring Marcia Cross as Jane Spofford, Kelly Rutherford as Alexandra Medford, Lori Loughlin as Sukie Ridgemont, and Jason O'Mara as Darryl Van Horne.

=== Cast comparison ===
The Witches of Eastwick (1987)	The Witches of Eastwick (1992)	Eastwick (2002)	Eastwick (2009)
Cher as Alexandra Medford	Ally Walker as Alexandra Spofford	Kelly Rutherford as Alexandra Medford	Rebecca Romijn as Roxanne Torcoletti
Susan Sarandon as Jane Spofford	Julia Campbell as Jane Hollis	Marcia Cross as Jane Spofford	Lindsay Price as Joanna Frankel
Michelle Pfeiffer as Sukie Ridgemont	Catherine Mary Stewart as Sukie Ridgemont	Lori Loughlin as Sukie Ridgemont	Jaime Ray Newman as Kat Gardener
Jack Nicholson as Daryl Van Horne	Michael Siberry as Darryl Van Horne	Jason O'Mara as Daryl Van Horne	Paul Gross as Daryl Van Horne

=== Development ===
The series is based on the 1984 novel The Witches of Eastwick and the film counterpart of the same name. While the book was written by John Updike, the series was conceived by Maggie Friedman, who wanted to create a show about female empowerment and a show that is magical but also real. ABC picked up the show in early 2009.

The series was filmed on the Warner Bros. Studios backlot, using the same town square as The WB's series, Gilmore Girls. Filming of the pilot began in August 2009 when all characters had been cast, the last one being Matt Dallas on July 30. ABC decided to put the show on the air Wednesdays at 10:00pm Eastern/9:00pm Central, after another new show, Cougar Town on ABC's Comedy Wednesdays.

There were initial suggestions that the show could potentially feature a musical episode, but this never occurred. The last day of shooting was held on November 16, 2009.

=== Cancellation ===
Eastwick was also one of the eighty-four shows canceled in 2010. After the series was canceled on November 9, Kristin of E! Online held an online campaign to determine which endangered show should be given another chance; Eastwick won the poll with 54.5% of the vote. Show creator Maggie Friedman was "said to be extremely frustrated and angry" with how the network mishandled the show.

== Reception ==
=== Critical reception ===
Eastwick initially opened with mixed reviews. Metacritic has given the series a score of 50% based on the pilot episode, from among 21 critical reviews. Entertainment Weekly gave the pilot episode a B, stating the show "plays like Desperate Housewives if the Wisteria Lane ladies liked prestidigitation instead of poker." Variety was also favorable by saying "the pilot represents a polished product that neatly introduces an array of characters and establishes Eastwick as a project with no small measure of potential." The Boston Globe gave the show a more positive review: its writer still compared it to Desperate Housewives while saying "Desperate Housewives is frustrating because it can't seem to decide what it is: murder mystery, silly farce, or realistic look at domestic woes. Eastwick is allegory and knows it, so it can be plausibly silly and over-the-top, and hint at real issues - women in the workplace, gender politics at home - without trying too hard ... I'll take Witch Hazel over Wisteria any day." The New York Post described Eastwick as the best new fall show of 2009, giving it a Grade A−, the highest score for any of the new shows graded.

=== International distribution ===
Eastwick saw better success internationally than in the United States. The show premiered in the United Kingdom on November 24, 2009. The pilot episode gathered 157,000 viewers on Hallmark Channel and 105,000 on Hallmark+1, the channel airing an hour behind the original channel, for a total of 262,000 viewers. During the week, it placed #2 on the Hallmark channel and #1 on Hallmark+1. Following episodes usually earned the top spot on the channel for the week. The sixth episode pulled in 194,000 viewers on Hallmark, and then an additional 110,000 at 11pm, totalling 304,000 viewers. The episode got #1 on both Hallmark and Hallmark+1.

The United Kingdom were the first to see episodes eleven and thirteen, the series finale, while both episodes remained unaired in the United States. Episode eleven aired on January 19, 2010, and gathered a total rating of 188,000 viewers. The series finale aired on February 14, 2010, achieved 201,000 on Hallmark as the highest of the series and 93,000 on Hallmark+1, resulting in a grand total of 294,000. The broadcasts on Hallmark averaged 157,846 viewers, Hallmark+1 averaged 69,846 viewers, and together averaged 227,692 viewers in total.

=== Ratings ===
Viewership and ratings per season of Eastwick
Season	Timeslot (ET)	Episodes	First aired		Last aired		TV season	Viewership rank	Avg. viewers (millions)	18–49 rank	Avg. 18–49 rating
Season	Timeslot (ET)	Episodes	Date	Viewers (millions)	Date	Viewers (millions)	TV season	Viewership rank	Avg. viewers (millions)	18–49 rank	Avg. 18–49 rating
1	Wednesday 10 p.m.	11	September 23, 2009	8.53	December 30, 2009	3.26	2009–10	85	5.88	69	2.0/5

Eastwick premiered with 8.53 million viewers, coming second in its timeslot, beaten only by CSI: NY. Excluding only Lost premieres and finales, Eastwick produced ABC's highest viewers and young adult numbers in the time period with regular programming in almost 2 years - since October 17, 2007 and October 24, 2007, respectively.

The September 30, 2009 episode dropped 1.91 million viewers from the pilot, and scored 6.62 million. Though it dropped in ratings, other shows that night also dropped the same amount. Growing from its week-ago series debut by 8%, Eastwick won its time period among Women 18-34, beating CSI: NY in the hour by 12% (2.8/8 vs. 2.5/8).

The October 7, 2009 episode was opposite CBS' time-period veteran CSI: NY, ABC's freshman Eastwick earned second place in the 10 o'clock hour, defeating NBC's Jay Leno for the 3rd week in a row among Adults 18-49 (1.8/5 vs. 1.7/5), but placed No. 1 in its hour with Women 18-34 (2.0/6-tie) for its 2nd consecutive telecast.

The October 14, 2009 episode beat out NBC's Jay Leno in Adults 18-34 (+15% - 1.5/5 vs. 1.3/4) and for the 3rd week in a row across each of the key Women demos (W18-34/W18-49/W25-54). It also grew its audience week to week in both Adults 18-34 (+7% - 1.5/5 vs. 1.4/4) and Adults 25-54 (+5% - 2.1/5 vs. 2.0/5).

The October 21, 2009 episode defeated NBC's Jay Leno in Adults 18-49 (+13% - 1.7/5 vs. 1.5/4), and was also seeing bumps from first-reported numbers through DVR playback, surging by 1.1 million viewers and by an additional 4-tenths of an Adult 18-49 rating point from the initially reported Live + Same Day Numbers to the Live + 7 Day DVR finals.

The October 28, 2009 episode continued to beat NBC's Jay Leno in the 10 o'clock hour, leading by 20% this week among Adults 18-49 (1.8/5 vs. 1.5/4), and built its Adult 18-49 audience by 13% over the prior week (1.8/5 vs. 1.6/4), tallying its best number in 3 weeks. It also saw bumps from the first-reported numbers through DVR playback, surging by 1.0 million viewers and by an additional 4-tenths of an Adult 18-49 rating point from the initially reported Live + Same Day Numbers to the Live + 7 Day DVR finals.

The November 4, 2009 episode continued to beat NBC's Jay Leno in the 10 o'clock hour (3 weeks in a row), leading by an even wider margin of 23% this week among Adults 18-49 (1.6/4 vs. 1.3/4), and saw bumps from the first-reported numbers through DVR playback, averaging an additional 1.0 million viewers and a 4-tenths of an Adult 18-49 rating point increase from the initially reported Live + Same Day Numbers to the Live + 7 Day DVR finals.

After the show was cancelled, ABC stopped advertising the show, meaning less viewers were highly likely.

The November 25, 2009 episode fell hard in ratings, mainly because of it being the day before Thanksgiving Day, in which all programmes that night took a hit in their ratings, also achieving season, or series, lows. It managed to pull 3.65 million in overnight ratings, but rose in final numbers to 3.89 million.

The December 2, 2009 episode was up week to week by 17% in Total Viewers (4.2 million vs. 3.6 million) and by 18% in Adults 18-49 (1.3/4 vs. 1.1/3). The ABC freshman drama ranked No. 2 in the hour with Adults 18-34 (1.1/3-tie) and among key Women: W18-34 (1.6/5), W18-49 (1.7/5-tie) and W25-54 (2.1/5). It saw bumps from the first-reported numbers through DVR playback, averaging an additional 1.0 million viewers and a 4-tenths of an Adult 18-49 rating point increase from the initially reported Live + Same Day Numbers to the Live + 7 Day DVR finals.

=== Legacy ===
Although Eastwick was short-lived, the supernatural drama became a favorite for fans of the occult. The pilot episode achieved 8.53 million viewers and remained the highest viewed telecast on ABC at the Wednesday 10pm slot until "Revenge" scored a 3.3 adults 18-49 rating and 10.02 million viewers in its September 2011 premiere.

The premiere episode also became one of the highest-viewed pilots of a supernatural series based on witches, even beating cult favorite Charmed (7.70 million viewers). In August 2010, it was "pick of the week" in The South African Times, where the journalist speculated the show would get a cult following.

== Awards and nominations ==
Year	Group	Award	Result	For
2010	People's Choice Awards	Favorite New TV Drama	Nominated	Eastwick
