= List of Witches of East End characters =

The following is a list of characters from the Lifetime supernatural drama Witches of East End, based on the book of the same name by Melissa de la Cruz. The series centers on a family of immortal witches known as the Beauchamps: Joanna (played by Julia Ormond) and her daughters Freya (played by Jenna Dewan-Tatum) and Ingrid (played by Rachel Boston), as well as her sister Wendy (played by Mädchen Amick).

== Main characters ==
=== Joanna Beauchamp ===
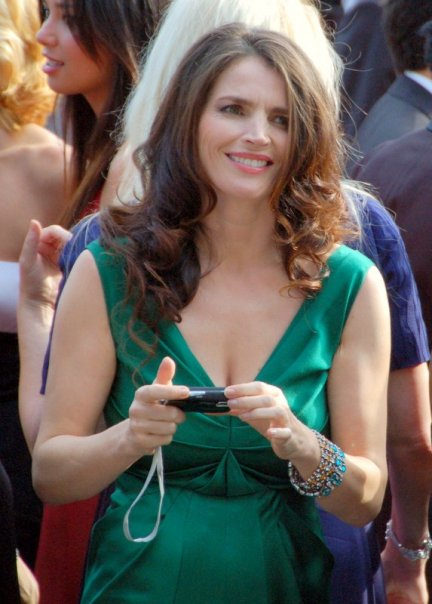
Joanna Beauchamp is portrayed by Julia Ormond.

Julia Ormond portrays Joanna Beauchamp, Ingrid and Freya's mother. She is an immortal witch who has lived for thousands of years, and has the powers of healing, telekinesis and limited weather control. Joanna and her sister Wendy (Mädchen Amick) originate from the magical world of Asgard, but they were banished by their father who became corrupt after coming into power. She also has a son named Frederick, who was left behind in Asgard. Joanna is cursed to watch her daughters Ingrid (Rachel Boston) and Freya (Jenna Dewan-Tatum) die young over and over again, but only to fall spontaneously pregnant again so the endless cycle can begin anew. After their thirteenth incarnation, Joanna decided to keep her daughters in the dark about their magical abilities in an attempt to protect them from the curse.

At the beginning of season one, evil shape shifter Penelope Gardiner (Virginia Madsen) disguises herself as Joanna and kills local elderly man Bill Thatcher. When Joanna gets arrested for the murder, she tells Ingrid that she and Freya are witches. After Bill's wife Maura (Gillian Barber) says she saw Joanna kill him, Wendy uses a memory spell to erase Maura's memory of the murderer. She is then discredited as a witness in her husband's murder and Joanna is exonerated. Her ex-husband and the father of her children, Victor (Joel Gretsch) returns to East End and they sleep together. In the season finale, she falls into Penelope Gardiner's trap. The woman reveals herself as Athena Browning, the daughter of Archibald Browning, the man Joanna killed in 1906, and injects her body with poisonous argentium. With Wendy's help, Joanna manages to kill Penelope and later witnesses Ingrid open the portal to Asgard.

In season two, Joanna is severely weakened by argentium. Her long-lost son, Frederick, appears on her doorstep and cures her, effectively winning back her trust and love. She introduces Frederick to her daughters and is happy to once again have her family back together, though Wendy is very distrustful of Frederick. Joanna later finds out that Freya and Victor have been kidnapped by two evil witches and goes to find them. Though she finds them, she finds Freya tied to deadly explosives and is forced to sacrifice one of her loved ones to save the other. In the end, Victor sacrifices himself, breaking Joanna's heart. When Ingrid and Freya die - again - she attempts to commit suicide, forcing Wendy to bring their father, Nikolaus, to their world to resurrect her daughters. Though he holds his end of the bargain, Joanna and the others are still distrustful of the man and travel back in time to collect a weapon to kill him. Her father sends Mason Tarkoff after them and she ends up only escaping with her life intact. However, by combining her powers with Freya's, Ingrid's and Wendy's, they manage to kill Nikolaus once and for all.

=== Wendy Beauchamp ===
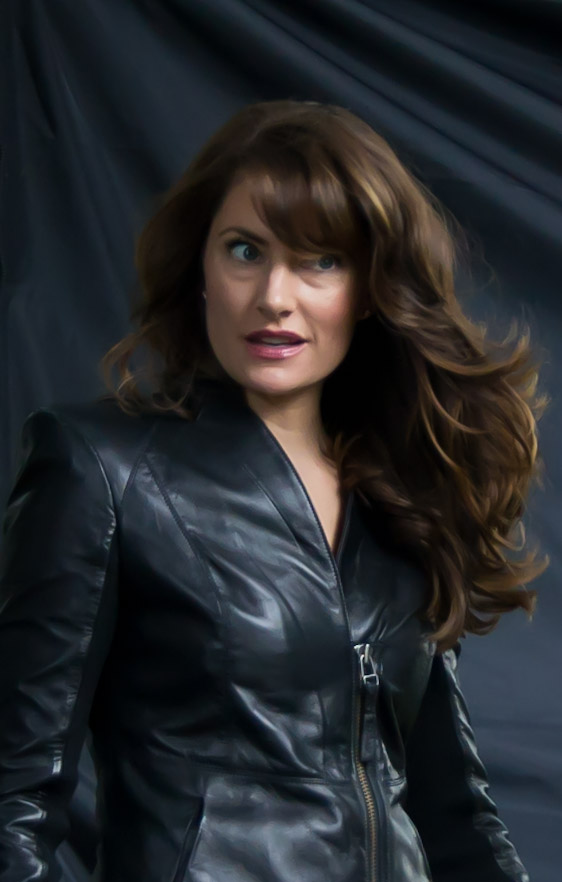
Wendy Beauchamp is portrayed by Mädchen Amick.

Mädchen Amick portrays Wendy Beauchamp, Joanna's long-estranged sister. Wendy is a witch and is cursed with the ability to change into a black cat. She has died several times but comes back to life in a matter of hours, due to her having nine lives. Her powers are healing, telekinesis and limited weather control. Wendy and her sister Joanna (Julia Ormond) originate from the magical world of Asgard, but they were banished by their father who became corrupt after coming into power. When she accidentally kills Joanna's daughter Ingrid (Rachel Boston) in 1906, Joanna tells Wendy to leave East End and never come back.

At the beginning of season one, Wendy returns to East End to warn Joanna that her life is in danger, and that she will need help from Ingrid and Freya (Jenna Dewan-Tatum) to save her. After Joanna's daughters discover that they are witches, Wendy teaches them how to use their powers. Wendy later begins a romantic fling with an entomologist named Leo Wingate (Freddie Prinze, Jr.), after she steals his prized Himalayan Stamped Crown butterfly to use for a spell. When evil shape shifter Penelope Gardiner (Virginia Madsen) reanimates the corpse of Ingrid from 1906, she sends past Ingrid after Wendy and kills her. Although Wendy was eventually revived, Joanna notices that her necklace has turned red, which means she is now on her ninth and final life.

In the beginning of season two, Wendy meets a paramedic named Tommy Cole and instantly form a liking to one another. When her nephew appears, she is incredibly suspicious of his motives, which are further encouraged by mysterious murders that started around the time Frederick arrived. She eventually comes to trust him when he saves her from the Mandragora, but loses her trust again when she finds out he was still in alliance with her father - the man who cursed her and her family. When Joanna attempts to commit suicide after facing Ingrid and Freya's death, she reluctantly agrees to bring Nikolaus to Earth in hopes of resurrecting the girls. She gives up her last life to save her boyfriend, and her spirit was taken to the Underworld where she is greeted by her "other sister".

The character of Wendy does not appear in the book version like the other main characters. In an interview with Collider.com, Mädchen Amick revealed that Wendy was originally brought into the show as a guest for the pilot episode, but after it was filmed, Lifetime decided to make Wendy a permanent character. Amick described her as a troublemaker who is "very loyal to her family". Amick said that during the first week filming Witches of East East, she noticed that Wendy is quite similar to the character Serena from Bewitched, and thinks that Serena "is an inspiration for Wendy".

=== Ingrid Beauchamp ===
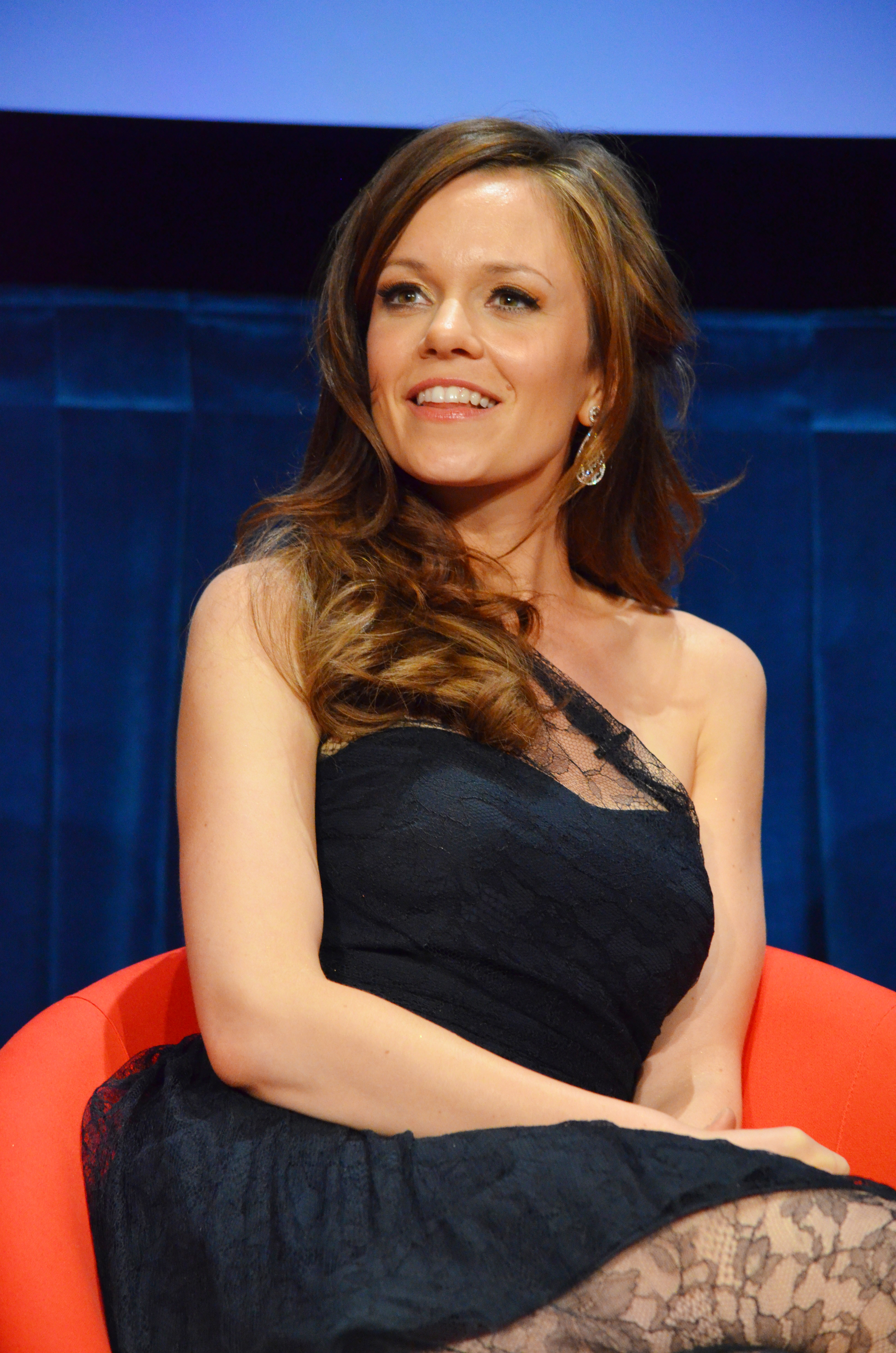
Ingrid Beauchamp is portrayed by Rachel Boston.

Rachel Boston portrays Ingrid Beauchamp, Freya's older sister. Ingrid works as a librarian. She did a dissertation on witchcraft and historical occult practices in post-colonial New York towns, but she never believed in magic before finding out she was a witch. Ingrid has lived many past lives, and in each one she dies young, only to be reborn again. She has the powers of healing, telekinesis and limited weather control, and has the ability to write new spells.

At the beginning of season one, when Joanna (Julia Ormond) gets arrested for murder she tells Ingrid that she and her sister are witches. Ingrid finds the family's grimoire to look for a spell to save Freya (Jenna Dewan-Tatum) who is trapped inside a painting, and a resurrection spell to revive Wendy (Mädchen Amick) who was killed by the evil shape shifter Penelope Gardiner (Virginia Madsen). However, when she comes back to life, Wendy tells Ingrid that the spell comes with a price - "If you resurrect someone you love, someone you love has to die". She dates detective Adam Noble (Jason Winston George) but their relationship ends when Adam dies as a result of Ingrid's resurrection spell. Ingrid later meets a novel writer named Mike (Enver Gjokaj), who believes that witches exist in East End and that they came from the magical world of Asgard. In the season one finale, Mike holds Ingrid at gunpoint to make her open the portal to Asgard, but the light within kills him instantly.

In season two, Ingrid starts working as a curator for documentary preservation of witchcraft. She finds herself blacking out repeatedly and unable to remember that she has been visiting a creature known as the Mandragora. Meanwhile, Ingrid confesses to Dash that she is a witch and he is a warlock after witnessing him kill a man and chooses to help him hide the secret. At the end of the series, she finds out she is pregnant, though unsure who the father is; Dash or the Mandragora.

In an interview with TV Wise, Rachel Boston revealed that before filming the pilot episode, she read many books on witchcraft to prepare for the role of Ingrid. Boston described Ingrid as smart and sensitive, and said that she "is ruled by her mind, intellect, and invention". When Boston was asked if there were any similarities between her and Ingrid, she said that there was because she relate to being out of her "comfort zone and in an unfamiliar land figuring it out step by step".

=== Freya Beauchamp ===
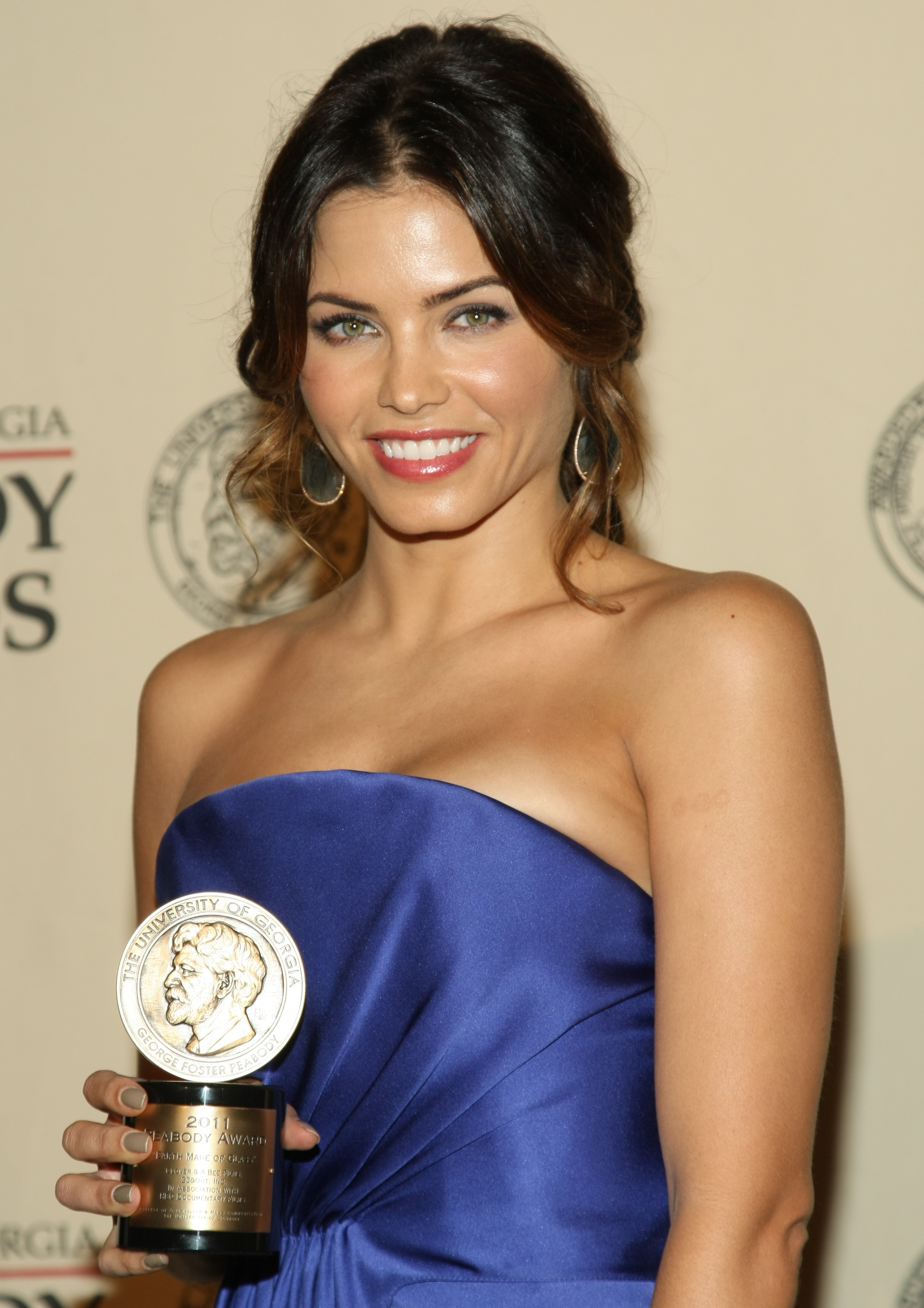
Freya Beauchamp is portrayed by Jenna Dewan-Tatum.

Jenna Dewan portrays Freya Beauchamp, Ingrid's younger sister. She works as a bartender at The Bent Elbow. Freya has lived many past lives, and in each one she dies young, only to be reborn again. She has the powers of premonition, healing, telekinesis and limited weather control, and is particularly talented with making potions.

At the beginning of season one, Freya learns she is a witch when her ex-boyfriend from one of her past lives, Doug (Neil Hopkins), tries to kill her inside a painting. Freya's engagement to Dash Gardiner (Eric Winter) is threatened by her erotic dreams involving a mysterious stranger who turns out to be Dash's long-lost brother Killian (Daniel Di Tomasso). She becomes attracted to Killian and they share a kiss during her and Dash's engagement party. Dash later finds out about the kiss when he overhears Freya and Killian talking about it, but he eventually forgives her. In the season one finale, Freya finds out from her father Victor (Joel Gretsch) that she and Killian loved each other in a past life. When she realizes that she loves Killian, Freya calls off her wedding to Dash to be with him. Freya's powers were taken from her by Dash and Killian's mother Penelope (Virginia Madsen) in the season one episode "Snake Eyes", but after Penelope's death in the finale, Freya's powers return to her.

In season two, Freya meets Frederick, her twin brother, and utilizes their gifts to find Killian, who had gone missing, and successfully locates him in Santo Domingo. She manages to find him, but is distraught to hear that he is married.

=== Dash Gardiner ===
Eric Winter portrays Dash Gardiner, Freya's fiancé and Killian's elder brother. He works as a doctor at the local hospital. Dash has a bad relationship with Killian (Daniel Di Tomasso) because he had sex with Dash's ex-fiancée, Elyse (Kaitlin Doubleday). He is unaware of Freya's (Jenna Dewan-Tatum) powers, and is also unaware that his mother Penelope (Virginia Madsen) is a witch who is out to kill Freya's mother Joanna (Julia Ormond). Dash was born a warlock, but Penelope took his powers at birth to use for herself.

At the beginning of season one, Dash and Freya are engaged. However, during their engagement party, Freya kisses Killian due to her having dreams about him. When Dash overhears the two talking about the kiss, he punches Killian and leaves for London. He eventually returns and forgives Freya. In the season one finale, Freya calls off the wedding and tells Dash that she is in love with Killian. Meanwhile, after Joanna kills Penelope, Dash's powers return to him. Dash finds Killian at the docks about to leave and, when he tries to hit him, he attacks Killian with his powers, leaving him unconscious on his boat. Unsure what to do, Dash unties the boat and sends it into the sea.

Dash initially experiences traumatizing hallucinations of Killian coming back to haunt him while still learning to control his powers. With Ingrid's help, he finds out that he is a warlock and begins to learn how to utilize his gifts. He is especially happy when he finds Killian alive and well.

=== Killian Gardiner ===
Daniel Di Tomasso portrays Killian Gardiner, Dash's younger brother. He does not get along with Dash (Eric Winter) because he had sex with Dash's ex-fiancé Elyse (Kaitlin Doubleday), three months before their wedding day. Killian was born a warlock, but his mother Penelope (Virginia Madsen) took his powers at birth to use for herself.

At the beginning of season one, Killian unexpectedly returns to East End during Dash and Freya's (Jenna Dewan-Tatum) engagement party. Before he met Freya, he had a dream about her. When they meet at the party, sparks (literally) fly, and Killian kisses Freya. He later gets a job at The Bent Elbow, where Freya works. Dash eventually finds out about Killian and Freya's kiss and punches him. In the season one episode "Electric Avenue", Killian almost dies when the ghost of Elyse gets him electrocuted, but he is saved by Dash. Killian dates Dash's co-worker Amy Matthews (Tiya Sircar), but she breaks up with him when she realizes he has feelings for Freya.

In the season one episode "A Parching Imbued", Killian reveals he is leaving town for good. He confesses his love for Freya and asks her to run away with him, but she chooses to stay with Dash. In the season one finale, it is revealed that Killian was Freya's lover Henry in one of her past lives. After Penelope's death, Killian and Dash's powers return to them, but due to Freya calling off her wedding to be with Killian, Dash attacks him with his powers and sets him adrift in the sea.

Killian finds out that he is a warlock in season two through new love interest, Eva, also a witch. They stay in Santo Domingo until Freya informs him that his mother died, prompting him to return home, and find out that his brother is a warlock as well.

=== Frederick Beauchamp ===
Frederick Beauchamp, portrayed by Christian Cooke, is Joanna and Victor's son, Ingrid's younger brother, and Freya's fraternal twin. He was left behind by his family in Asgard centuries ago, after he was turned against them by his grandfather and Joanna was forced to leave him behind.

In the beginning of season 2, Frederick comes through the portal after Ingrid opened it, and shows up on his family's doorstep, though his motives are still questionable. He takes note that Joanna is poisoned by Argentium and cures her. His mother and sisters are excited to have him back in the family, but Wendy remains distrustful and suspicious of his actions. Her suspicions are encouraged by the mysterious murders occurring around town. He eventually gains her trust when he saves her from the Mandragora, but later loses it again, along with the rest of his family's, when they find out he had been working with Nikolaus, whom he was led to believe to have changed for the better. At the end of the series, he sides with his family against Nikolaus and helps Ingrid create a time portal to save Joanna, Wendy and Freya. He was eventually murdered by a mysterious woman, with his blood drawing "Death to Witches" on the floor.

== Recurring characters ==
=== Penelope Gardiner/Athena Browning ===
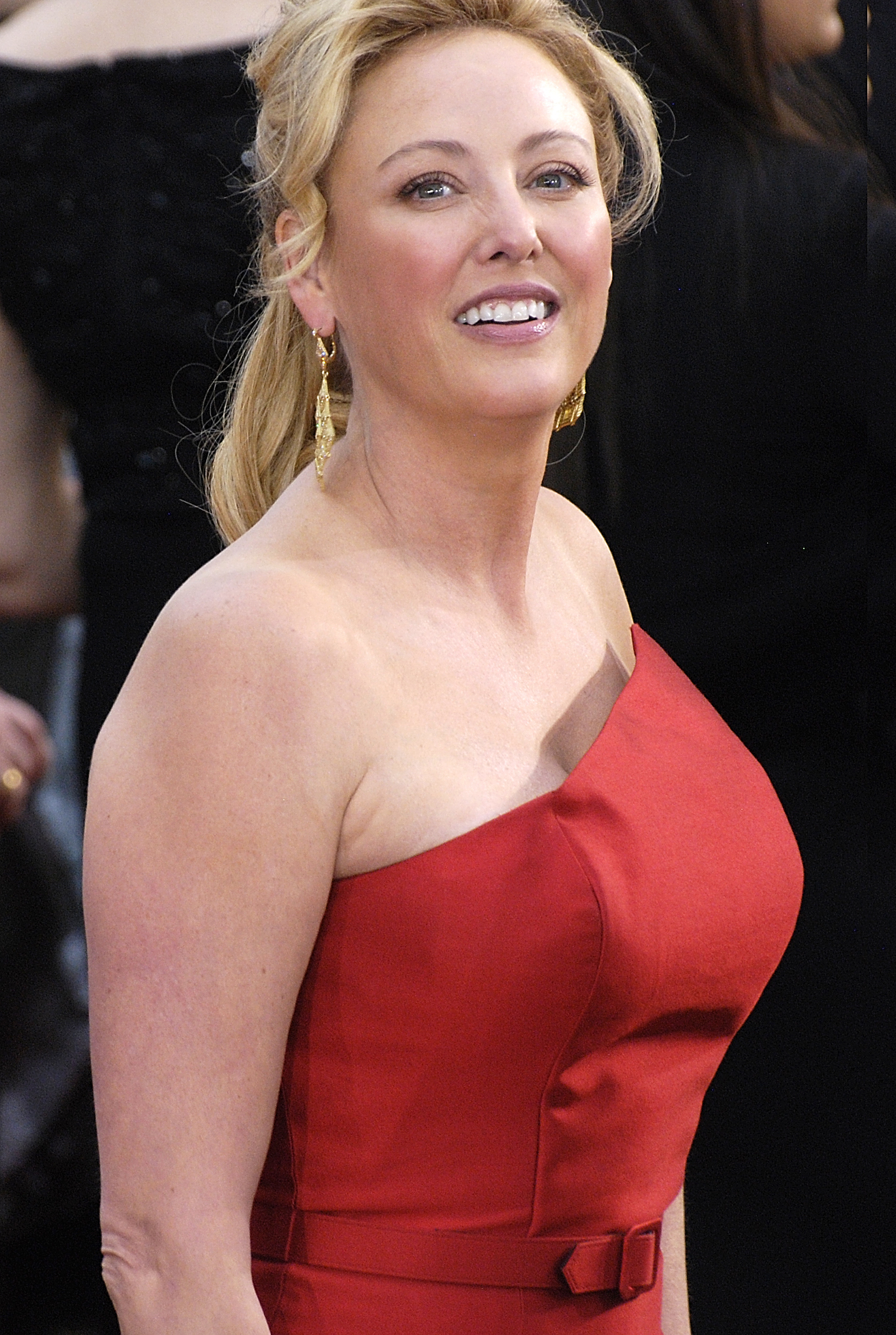
Penelope Gardiner is portrayed by Virginia Madsen.

Penelope Gardiner (born Athena Browning) appears in eight episodes of season one; she is portrayed by Virginia Madsen. Penelope is a powerful witch and the mother of Dash (Eric Winter) and Killian (Daniel Di Tomasso). As a child, she witnessed Joanna Beauchamp (Julia Ormond) kill her father Archibald Browning in 1906, and had been awaiting the chance for revenge ever since. At the beginning of season one, Penelope disguises herself as Joanna and kills local elderly man Bill Thatcher when he sees her performing a spell in the park. She also frees a man from a painting in Joanna's house, and sends him to exact revenge on Joanna's daughter Freya (Jenna Dewan-Tatum). In the episode "Unburied", Penelope reanimates the corpse of Joanna's other daughter Ingrid (Rachel Boston) from 1906, and sends her after Joanna's sister Wendy (Mädchen Amick). In the episode "Snake Eyes", Penelope disguises herself as a courier and gives Freya a box of roses which she cast a spell on. When Freya falls asleep, as a result of touching the roses, Penelope casts a spell on her and steals her powers. In the season finale, Penelope reveals her true identity to Joanna and that she stole Dash and Killian's powers when they were babies to make herself stronger. After Joanna kills her, Dash, Killian and Freya all regain their powers.

=== Hudson Rafferty ===
Hudson Rafferty, played by Tom Lenk, is Ingrid's friend who works at the local library with her.

He is attacked by the Mandragora in Season 2. Frederick tries to save him from the venom with a Spell but Wendy refuses to let him because she still does not fully trust him. Hudson dies in Ingrid's arms after she apologizes for putting him in harm's way.

=== Barb ===
Barb, played by Kellee Stewart, is Ingrid's pregnant best friend who works at the local library with her. She was originally unable to conceive, but Ingrid performed a fertility spell on her. Ingrid still didn't know she was a witch, and only cast the spell to make her feel better, but it ended up being successful.

=== Adam Noble ===
Adam Noble, played by Jason Winston George, is Ingrid's love interest. A while after she cast a resurrection spell to revive Wendy, the spell's side-effect takes Adam's life and his spirit lingered in the physical world until Ingrid sent him away.

=== Harrison Welles ===
Harrison Welles, played by Anthony Lemke, is a powerless yet immortal warlock friend of Joanna's, working as a lawyer. Harrison comes to east end in season 1 episode 2 to be Joanna's Lawyer when she's accused of murder. In episodes 4 and 5 he is working on Joanna's case until the charges are dropped against Joanna in episode 5. After the charges are dropped Joanna and Harrison have sex, though Joanna runs away from him right after stating that he should go back to help his other client, Harrison seems to want more and seems disappointed by Joanna's reaction to him. Harrison leaves town never to be seen again.

=== Maura Thatcher ===
Maura Thatcher, played by Gillian Barber, is an old woman whose husband was killed by Penelope disguised as Joanna. She tried to send Joanna to jail, but Wendy used a memory spell, which is irreversible, to erase her memory of the murderer. However, the spell had unintended consequences and caused Maura to begin hallucinating, eventually leading to her being committed to a psychiatric facility. Joanna and Wendy cast another spell, allowing her mind to remain in a peaceful dream world where her husband was still alive and the attack had never happened.

=== Amy Matthews ===
Amy Matthews, played by Tiya Sircar, is Dash's partner at the hospital. She dated Killian briefly until she found out that he had feelings for Freya, and was later killed by Penelope using liquefied Argentium.

=== Victor ===
Victor, played by Joel Gretsch, is Joanna's ex-husband and Freya, Ingrid and Frederick's father. He had kept his distance for all of the centuries, only to be sought out by Wendy when Freya loses her powers. In the season one finale, he recognizes Killian as Henry, Freya's lover from one of her past lives, and tells her this.

Victor is killed in Season 2 by the Zurkas, who are trying to open the Portal to Asgard.

=== King Nikolaus ===
King Nikolaus, played by Steven Berkoff, the patriarch of the Beauchamp family.

During their lifetime in Asgard, the king became corrupted by an enchanted key and wreaked havoc to the world. His family opposed him, minus his grandson Frederick, who sided with him. When he forced them out of Asgard, he cursed his daughters and granddaughters. His younger daughter Wendy then cut off his arm to seize the key and used it to close the portal to Asgard.

=== Mason Tarkoff ===
Played by James Marsters, Mason Tarkoff is a powerful telepath who is deeply loyal to the king. His telepathic powers are so strong that he has been able to communicate to the king for centuries about the things going on, on Earth.

== Guest characters ==
- Freddie Prinze, Jr. as Leo Wingate, a butterfly collector who is infatuated with Wendy.
- Bianca Lawson as Eva Gardiner, a witch who casts a spell on Killian which causes him to fall in love and marry her so that she may have another baby. She dies of old age. Her great-granddaughter, Selina, appears also played by Bianca Lawson.
- Brianne Davis as Caitlin, her role was supposed to appear in the pilot episode, but she was removed for unknown reasons.
- Matt Frewer as Vidar, an old warlock who turned in Freya and Ingrid in the 17th century and Joanna cut off his ear as a result. Centuries later, he was sought out by Penelope Gardiner for a revenge plot against Joanna, which leads to his destruction.
- Neil Hopkins as Doug, an old warlock boyfriend of Freya's trapped in a desert painting before Penelope freed him. He was eventually re-captured in another painting.
- Enver Gjokaj as Mike, a researcher set out to find the entrance to Asgard, and risks losing his own life to reveal Ingrid's identity as a witch. In the season finale, he holds Ingrid at gunpoint to make her open the portal to Asgard, but the light within destroys him instantly, thus ends his quest midway.
- Matthew Del Negro as Archibald Browning, the warlock founder of Fairhaven and father of Penelope Gardiner, formerly known as Athena Browning. He was a cult leader who was in love with Ingrid, and was destroyed by Joanna when Ingrid was killed. His death led Penelope to plot a vengeful plan against the Beauchamps.
- Kaitlin Doubleday as Elyse, Dash's ex-fiancée. She slept with Killian three months before her wedding with Dash, which cost her marriage. Killian refused to accept her and she killed herself. When Ingrid performed a spell to summon Adam Noble's spirit, Elyse followed to find the Gardiner brothers again and almost kills Killian. She is eventually sent back to the spirit realm by Freya.
- Michelle Hurd as Alex, Joanna's lover from the 70's who returns to help stop the mandragora while also rekindling her relationship.
- Ignacio Serricchio as Tommy Cole, a paramedic who takes a liking to Wendy. They first meet at the East End Public Library looking for the same book and fight over it, and again when Ingrid accidentally dislocates her shoulder. Though they bicker, they really like each other. It doesn't take long before Tommy asks Wendy out, and though the date goes disastrous, Tommy insists on being with her. He eventually finds out Wendy is a witch, and while frightened at first, he remained infatuated with her and tried to make their relationship work. Unfortunately, his knowledge caught the attention of Mason Tarkoff, who used his body as a vessel to revive King Nikolaus.
- Anthony Konechny as the Mandragora, a humanoid beast with blue skin, a long tail and tentacles. The creature came through the portal from Asgard around the time it was opened, and has a connection with Ingrid Beauchamp.
- Renee Victor as Alma, Eva's favorite daughter in her nineties who passes herself off as her mother's grandmother in order to carry out their plans. She dies of a heart attack.
- Shaun Smyth as Dr. Frank Foster, a professor who studies the history of witchcraft and the occult. He was forced to hire Ingrid before he was killed.
- Rachel Nichols and Callard Harris as Isis and Ivar of the Zurka witch clan from Asgard. According to Frederick, they are low-born shape-shifters who used to follow him around and support his brash endeavours, getting into trouble and mocking those in charge. This reckless behaviour eventually got them banished from Asgard, and they return to East End to find the portal key and travel back by any means necessary, even if they have to torture the Beauchamps to get it.
- Casey Manderson as Kyle Hutton, a spoiled young man who witnessed Dash's powers the night he attacked Killian, and filmed the whole incident to blackmail Dash later. While at first obligable to his demands, Kyle's greed for more money forced Dash to take action. This angered Kyle and sought him out to blackmail him personally, which fatally backfired.
- Eddie McClintock as Ronan/Seamus, Wendy's ex-husband and mysterious artist who shows up in Season 2/Episode 7, Art of Darkness to profess his love for Wendy. They have been married three turbulent times and Wendy says the last time she saw him was in the 90's. He says that all his paintings of her are his love letter to her. It is clear Wendy feels conflicted as she initially spurns his advances but after reminiscing with him they share a moment of passion. However, after Ronan reveals that every painting he has made has a piece of Wendy, she is perturbed and tells him to leave her alone forever.
