= Kellee Stewart =

American actress (born 1976)

- Born: March 31, 1976 (age 50); Norristown, Pennsylvania, U.S.
- Education: State University of New York, Purchase (BFA)
- Years active: 2000–present
- Children: 1

Kellee Stewart (born March 31, 1976) is an American actress.

== Early life ==
Stewart grew up in Norristown, Pennsylvania and graduated from Norristown Area High School in 1993. Stewart also attended the BFA Acting Program at State University of New York at Purchase. Stewart graduated with honors and lived in New York City, New York and worked as a talent agent at Funny Face Today, FFT before moving to California.

== Career ==
Stewart is best known for her role of Keisha in the 2005 hit movie Guess Who alongside Bernie Mac and friend Zoe Saldaña. From 2006 to 2010 Stewart played Stephanie Lane on the TBS sitcom My Boys. Stewart has continued her television career appearing in hit shows including Law and Order: SVU, The Soul Man, All American, Chicago Med, On My Block, Killing It, Paper Girls, Bones, Black-ish just to name a few. In film, she co-starred in Hot Tub Time Machine (2010), Hot Tub Time Machine 2, as well as the indie hit Hunter Gatherer alongside Andre Royo. She starred in several comedy pilots, like ABC's Middle Age Rage, Damaged Goods, and CBS's pilot Pandas In New York. She was cast in recurring role on Lifetime series Witches of East End. And was also cast as series regular in Lifetime drama pilot HR opposite Alicia Silverstone.

In 2016, Stewart was cast as Madonna Reed in NBC's supernatural drama Midnight Texas, based on the book series by Charlaine Harris. Stewart reprised her role in the drama premiering its second season in 2018.

Stewart began her producing and writing career when she created a single camera comedy for 20th Century Fox Studios and FOX Broadcasting Network titled BBF (Black Best Friend). The comedy was based on her real life casting experiences and childhood relationships. BBF is co-created with Sebastian Jones, who executive produces along with Cedric the Entertainer. In addition to starring in BBF, Stewart serves as executive producer and co-writer of story.

In 2017, Stewart was seen in a starring role in Lifetime network's movie Love By The 10th Date written and directed by Nzingah Stewart.

Stewart wrote and produces the optioned television movie 29 Eggs based on her personal fertility story. She began publicly advocating for reproductive health and fertility in 2000. Stewart created and hosts “Warrior Wednesdays”, a live interactive Instagram weekly show focused on fertility. Stewart interviews patients and doctors for candid and revealing conversations. Stewart quickly became a sought after fertility advocate and has worked with Resolve - The National Infertility Association, as well as The American Society of Reproductive Medicine. In 2022 Stewart received Resolve's Night of Hope Award for Social Impact and excellence in advocacy. In 2023 Stewart partnered with Evite, the largest online invitation platform, to form Parenthood Journey - a new category of invitations focused on the infertility community at large and those on a journey to parenthood.

Currently Stewart is writing and developing content for various television and media outlets.

== Filmography ==
=== Film ===
Year	Title	Role	Notes
2000	Let's Talk	Black Militant Leader	
2003	Cry Funny Happy	Sophie	
2003	Deprivation	-	
2005	Guess Who	Keisha Jones	
2005	Monster-in-Law	Make-Up Girl	
2005	Crazylove	Market Clerk	
2007	I'm Through with White Girls	J.C. Evans	
2010	Hot Tub Time Machine	Courtney Agnew	
2014	Heaven's Hard Pitches	Sherrelle Anderson	Short
2015	Hot Tub Time Machine 2	Courtney Webber	
2016	Hunter Gatherer	Nat	
2016	Psychophonia	Isabel	
2016	Crunch Time	Marcelle	TV movie
2017	Love by the 10th Date	Nell	TV movie
2018	A Boy. A Girl. A Dream.	Herself	
2018	Pandas in New York	Ngozi	TV movie
2019	Pride & Prejudice: Atlanta	Charlotte	TV movie

=== Television ===
Year	Title	Role	Notes
2001	Undeclared	Student	Episode: "Addicts"
2001	The Education of Max Bickford	Yolanda	Episode: "In the Details"
2003	Law & Order: Special Victims Unit	Neva	Episode: "Control"
2005	Living with Fran	Vanessa	Episode: "Pilot"
2005	Sex, Love & Secrets	Deena Jackson	Episode: "Fear" & "Abandonment"
2006–10	My Boys	Stephanie Layne	Main cast
2012	Whitney	Valerie	Episode: "Mad Women"
2012–15	The Soul Man	Kim	Recurring cast: season 1–3, guest: season 4
2013	Witches of East End	Barb	Recurring cast: Season 1
2014	Bones	Debra Ann Volker	Episode: "The Carrot in the Kudzu"
2015	Newsreaders	Famke Carbonale	Episode: "The FMK Killer; Newsreaders: Behind the Scenes"
2015	HOARS	Treacle	Episode: "No Aggressive Fondling on Grassy Knolls 8 (F32)"
2017–18	Midnight, Texas	Madonna Reed	Recurring cast
2018	The Resident	Barb	Episode: "Comrades in Arms"
2018	Black-ish	Angela	Episode: "Friends Without Benefits"
2018	Now We're Talking	Shonda	Episode: "Episode #2.6"
2020	Cherish the Day	Ellene	Recurring cast
2020	A.P. Bio	Marjorie	Episode: "Mr. Pistachio"
2020-21	All American	Nurse Joy	Guest: season 2, recurring cast: season 3-4
2021	On My Block	Brandy	Recurring cast: season 4
2022	Chicago Med	Carmen Walker	Recurring cast: season 7
2022	Killing It	Rita Gaines (voice)	Episode: "Kickoff" & "Dominine"
