= Young Catherine =

1991 UK miniseries

- VHS cover, featuring Vanessa Redgrave and Julia Ormond
- Written by: Chris Bryant
- Directed by: Michael Anderson
- Starring: Vanessa Redgrave; Julia Ormond
- Music by: Isaac Schwartz
- Country of origin: United Kingdom
- Original language: English

Production
- Producer: Neville C. Thompson
- Cinematography: Ernest Day
- Editor: Ron Wisman
- Running time: 150 minutes

Original release
- Release: February 17, 1991

Young Catherine is a 1991 British TV miniseries based on the early life of Catherine II of Russia. Directed by Michael Anderson, it stars Julia Ormond as Catherine and Vanessa Redgrave as Empress Elizabeth.

== Plot summary ==
In the early 1740s, Elizabeth, Empress of Russia, is seeking a bride for her nephew and heir, Peter. She picks the beautiful Princess Sophie, a teenager from a tiny German-speaking state. It's a huge change of fortune for the naive young girl. After arriving in Russia, she is received into the Russian Orthodox Church under the new name Catherine. Though she feels like an outsider at first, she eventually becomes devoted to her new homeland, its culture and its people.

But her personal life is in turmoil. Peter is mentally unbalanced and sometimes vicious. Shortly after the couple's wedding, he makes clear that the marriage will never be consummated. Meanwhile, Empress Elizabeth, whose anger is legendary, expects Catherine to produce an heir or perhaps suffer the consequences. One of the troubled Catherine's few confidants is an aging, worldly-wise British diplomat, Sir Charles Williams. On his advice, she gives up her virginity to a soldier who is devoted to her, and bears a child, Paul, who is officially Peter's son and heir.

As the life of the old empress draws to an end, Peter increasingly threatens to take "revenge" on Catherine, and on Russia itself, once he occupies the throne. Catherine and her supporters at court realize that action is needed to protect her, and some warn that ultimately, the struggle may come down to her life or Peter's.

== Cast ==
- Vanessa Redgrave as Empress Elizabeth
- Christopher Plummer as Sir Charles Williams
- Julia Ormond as Grand Duchess Catherine
- Franco Nero as Count Mikhail Vorontsov
- Marthe Keller as Princess Johanna
- Maximilian Schell as Frederick the Great
- Mark Frankel as Count Grigory Orlov
- Reece Dinsdale as Grand Duke Peter
- Anna Kanakis as Countess Vorontsova
- John Shrapnel as Archimandrite Todorsky
- Hartmut Becker as Prince Christian August
- Alexander Kerst as Prussian Ambassador
- Laurie Holden as Princess Catherine Dashkova
- Katharine Schlesinger as Elizabeth Vorontsova
- Katya Galitzine as Maria Choglokov
- Rory Edwards as Alexis Orlov

== Award and nominations ==
Primetime Emmy Awards

- Primetime Emmy Award for Outstanding Supporting Actress in a Miniseries or a Movie - Vanessa Redgrave (nomination)
- Primetime Emmy Award for Outstanding Costumes for a Miniseries, Movie or a Special - Larisa Konnikova (nomination)

Gemini Award

- Best Dramatic Mini-Series (won)
- Best Costume Design - Larisa Konnikova (nomination)
- Best Performance by an Actress in a Leading Role in a Dramatic Program or Mini-Series - Julia Ormond (nomination)
- Best Photography in a Dramatic Program or Series - Ernest Day (nomination)
- Best Production Design or Art Direction - Harold Thrasher, Natalya Vasilyeva (nomination)

== Versions ==
Both a 150-minute version and a 180-minute Turner Network Television version were released on VHS on May 29, 1991, and both are currently out of print. A 187-minute Russian language version was at one time available on DVD. The film became available on DVD from the Warner Bros Archive Collection on November 19, 2013.
