= Darin Goldberg =

American television writer and producer

- Education: University of Southern California
- Occupations: Television producer, television writer
- Years active: 1996–present
- Spouse: Karen Alexandrea Goldberg

Darin Goldberg is an American television writer and producer. He has worked on Wild Card, Strong Medicine, Time of Your Life, Push, Dawson's Creek, Fame L.A., Dangerous Minds, The Young and the Restless and New York Undercover.

== Television credits ==
=== Writing ===
- HawthoRNe
- Strong Medicine
- Wild Card
- The Young and the Restless
- Time of Your Life
- Push
- Dawson's Creek
- Fame L.A.
- Dangerous Minds
- New York Undercover
- Rizzoli & Isles
- King & Maxwell
- The Witches of East End

=== Producing ===
- HawthoRNe
- Strong Medicine
- Time of Your Life
- Dawson's Creek
