= Witches of East End (TV series) =

2014 American supernatural TV series

- Genre: Supernatural drama; Fantasy; Comedy drama
- Based on: Witches of East End by Melissa de la Cruz
- Developed by: Maggie Friedman
- Starring: Julia Ormond; Mädchen Amick; Jenna Dewan; Rachel Boston; Daniel Di Tomasso; Eric Winter; Christian Cooke
- Composers: Lisa Coleman; Wendy Melvoin; Peter Nashal
- Country of origin: United States
- Original language: English
- No. of seasons: 2
- No. of episodes: 23 (list of episodes)

Production
- Executive producers: Maggie Friedman; Erwin Stoff; Allan Arkush; Richard Hatem; Josh Reims; Jessica Tuchinsky; Mark Waters
- Producers: Shawn Williamson; Kelly A. Manners
- Production locations: Wilmington, North Carolina (pilot only); Vancouver, British Columbia, Canada
- Cinematography: Robert Aschmann; Mathias Herndl; John Lindley
- Editors: Bruce Green; Randy Jon Morgan; Pattye Rogers; Sharidan Sotelo; Nancy Forner; Jacque Elaine Toberen
- Running time: 43 minutes
- Production companies: 3 Arts Entertainment; Curly Girly Productions; Fox 21

Original release
- Network: Lifetime
- Release: October 6, 2013 – October 5, 2014

Witches of East End is an American television series based on the 2011 novel of the same name by Melissa de la Cruz. The series premiered on Lifetime on October 6, 2013, and ended on October 5, 2014, after two seasons. Set in the fictional seaside town of East End, it follows the lives of a family of witches – Joanna Beauchamp (Julia Ormond) and her two grown-up daughters, Freya Beauchamp (Jenna Dewan) and Ingrid Beauchamp (Rachel Boston), as well as her sister Wendy Beauchamp (Mädchen Amick).

On November 22, 2013, Lifetime renewed Witches of East End for a second season to consist of 13 episodes, which premiered on July 6, 2014. On November 4, 2014, Lifetime cancelled Witches of East End after a decline in ratings during the second season. The series finale aired on October 5, 2014.

== Overview ==
The series stars Julia Ormond as Joanna Beauchamp, a witch and mother of Freya Beauchamp (Jenna Dewan) and Ingrid Beauchamp (Rachel Boston), who are part of the next generation of witches. Mädchen Amick co-stars as Joanna's mischievous witch sister Wendy Beauchamp. The series is loosely based on the book's plot, with one change being that Freya and Ingrid are initially unaware of their magical powers.

== Cast ==
- Julia Ormond as Joanna Beauchamp
- Mädchen Amick as Wendy Beauchamp (Note: Guest in pilot, starring from episode 2 onwards.)
- Jenna Dewan as Freya Beauchamp
- Rachel Boston as Ingrid Beauchamp
- Daniel Di Tomasso as Killian Gardiner
- Eric Winter as Dash Gardiner
- Christian Cooke as Frederick Beauchamp (season 2)

== Production ==
=== Development ===
On July 19, 2012, it was announced that Lifetime had ordered a pilot for Witches of East End for its 2013 season, and that the show would be executive-produced by both Maggie Friedman and Erwin Stoff, and produced by Fox 21. On January 31, 2013, it was revealed that Lifetime had picked up Witches of East End with ten episodes and that it was scheduled to premiere later that year. The executive VP of programming for Lifetime Networks, Rob Sharenow, said "We've been thrilled about Witches of East End and its powerful premise since the moment we bought the property, and our friends at Fox 21 helped develop it for television. This is one of the most exciting ensemble casts we've seen and the whole show is fresh, original and just right for Lifetime."

=== Casting ===
On August 30, 2012, it was announced that Julia Ormond had landed a main role on the show, as Joanna Beauchamp. On September 14, 2012, the role of Freya Beauchamp was officially given to Jenna Dewan, who publicly announced on December 17, 2012, that she and then husband Channing Tatum were expecting their first child. On September 17, 2012, the leading male role of Dash Gardiner was assigned to Patrick Heusinger. And on September 19, 2012, Rachel Boston and model Daniel Di Tomasso were announced to have earned the two remaining main roles, respectively Ingrid Beauchamp and Killian Gardiner. Finally, as announced on September 25, 2012, Nicholas Gonzalez would portray detective Matt Torcoletti. On October 9, 2012, two guest star announcements were made: Mädchen Amick, who then became a part of the permanent main cast, and Glenne Headly - Amick as Wendy (Joanna's sister) and a leading role and Headly as Penelope (the Gardiner brothers' mother). Tom Lenk was later given the role of Hudson Rafferty, Ingrid's best friend, as announced on October 16, 2012.

The original casting underwent subsequent changes. As revealed by Nicholas Gonzalez himself on his Twitter account, a few days after the pick-up announcement, the actor was dropped from the show, and on June 6, 2013, it was announced that Patrick Heusinger's role as Dash Gardiner would be recast, for creative reasons. On June 26, TVLine revealed that Eric Winter would replace Patrick Heusinger as Dash Gardiner. On July 9, the recurring role of the detective Adam (formerly Matt Torcoletti) was assigned to Jason George. On July 12, Virginia Madsen replaced Glenne Headly for a multi-episode arc as Penelope, Dash and Killian's mother. On August 12, Freddie Prinze, Jr. booked a guest role on the show, as Leo Wingate, with a possibility that it could become recurring. On August 14, Anthony Lemke was cast as recurring Harrison Welles.

=== Filming ===
Filming the pilot episode began on October 16, 2012, in the port town of Wilmington, North Carolina, where several scenes were shot. On October 29, 2012, the crew moved for a week to Macon, Georgia, where they filmed the wedding scenes for the pilot at the historical Hay House.

When the network Lifetime announced Witches of East End was going to be a series, it was also revealed that filming for the rest of the series would happen in Vancouver, British Columbia, Canada, instead of continuing to be filmed in Wilmington. Maggie Friedman announced on Twitter on June 10 that she was scouting locations for the series, trying to "find Fair Haven".

== Episodes ==
| Season | Episodes | Originally released | |
| Season | Episodes | First released | Last released |
|---|---|---|---|
| 1 | 10 | October 6, 2013 | December 15, 2013 |
| 2 | 13 | July 6, 2014 | October 5, 2014 |

== Reception ==
=== Critical reception ===
Critical reaction to Witches of East End has been mixed, with a score of 50 on Metacritic and 70% for the first season on Rotten Tomatoes with a consensus saying "Although it's ridiculously soapy, Witches of East End is often campy fun; it's a supernatural spectacle that's entertaining despite its silliness."

Lori Rackl of Chicago Sun-Times described the show as a "soapy, silly adaptation of Melissa de la Cruz's best-seller." Matthew Gilbert of Boston Globe reviewed the show saying "[It] will remain a missable new supernatural series populated by wooden actors and feeble plotlines." Matt Roush of TV Guide summed up his review saying "Whatever the opposite of spellbinding is, that's this show." Diane Werts of Newsday gave the show a more positive review, saying "What's utterly clear is that the starter hour picks up steam whenever loose-cannon Amick bops around -- although Ormond does a nice job of grounding its shenanigans in a semblance of reality." She finishes her review giving the pilot a B rating. Allison Keene from The Hollywood Reporter also praised the premiere, claiming "Witches of East End is up against a number of other supernatural shows, and there becomes a question of saturation. Fortunately or unfortunately, we aren't at that point, yet. It seems there's plenty more room at the table, and there, Witches of East End currently looks like the most fun." Neil Genzlinger of The New York Times also gave the show a glowing review, starting off by negatively reviewing the "humorless" witches on shows such as the 2013 debuts of Sleepy Hollow and The Originals, then going on to say Witches of East End is a welcome relief to those series. He further applauds the casting and characters, saying "thanks to zippy repartee among the stars. Ms. Amick is hilarious, and Ms. Dewan Tatum and Ms. Boston make a pretty amusing pair of mismatched sisters." He ends the review with "there is a lot of heavy fare on television on Sunday nights. If Witches can retain its wry tone, it will be a satisfying alternative for viewers looking for a lighter way to end the weekend." Lily Moayeri of Under the Radar compared the show with Charmed saying "Witch-themed shows work better when both the witches and the target audience are teenagers. The grown-up witches on Witches of East End are just a little too ridiculous — even more so than the witch sister trio of Charmed."

=== Audience viewership ===
Witches of East End premiered on a Sunday night to 1.93 million viewers and a 0.7 18-49 rating. The premiere rated on par to the June 23 premiere of Lifetime's other new show Devious Maids; however, Witches of East End ended the night being the number two scripted drama on cable, behind Boardwalk Empire on HBO.

The following week, Witches of East End pulled a total of 1.93 million viewers and rose to a 0.8 18-49 rating, despite the return of The Walking Dead and its talk show Talking Dead breaking records on AMC. The show remained the second highest-rated cable drama of the night again, behind The Walking Dead.

| Season | Timeslot (EST) | Number of episodes | Premiere | | | Finale | | | Average (in millions) |
| Season | Timeslot (EST) | Number of episodes | Date | Viewers (millions) | 18–49 Rating | Date | Viewers (millions) | 18–49 Rating | Average (in millions) |
|---|---|---|---|---|---|---|---|---|---|
| 1 | Sunday 10:00 pm | 10 | October 6, 2013 | 1.93 | 0.7 | December 15, 2013 | 1.74 | 0.6 | 1.67 |
| 2 | Sunday 9:00 pm | 13 | July 6, 2014 | 1.12 | 0.5 | October 5, 2014 | 1.03 | 0.4 | 1.13 |

== Broadcasts ==
Witches of East End premiered in the United Kingdom on November 5, 2013, on the second night of the newly formed UK channel, Lifetime UK. The second season premiered on August 25, 2014. In Australia, Witches of East End premiered on Eleven on August 4, 2014.

== Cancellation and fan campaign ==
On November 4, 2014, it was announced that Lifetime had cancelled Witches of East End after a decline in ratings during the second season. The first season averaged 1.67 million viewers, but dropped in its second season to 1.13 million. After its cancellation, fans launched an online petition campaign to save the show called "Renew Witches of East End". The petition became popular on Twitter, where fans were told to use the hashtag #RenewWitchesofEastEnd and tweet it to Lifetime's Twitter account. Fans have also campaigned the online streaming service Netflix to pick up the show. The campaign received support from celebrities on Twitter who backed the show to be renewed, including Channing Tatum, William Shatner and Snooki as well as stars from television series such as Buffy the Vampire Slayer's Sarah Michelle Gellar and Charmed's Shannen Doherty and Holly Marie Combs. As of February 2024 and after 9 years since the finale, the petition has received more than 280,000 signatures.
