= Eric Winter =

American actor (born 1976)

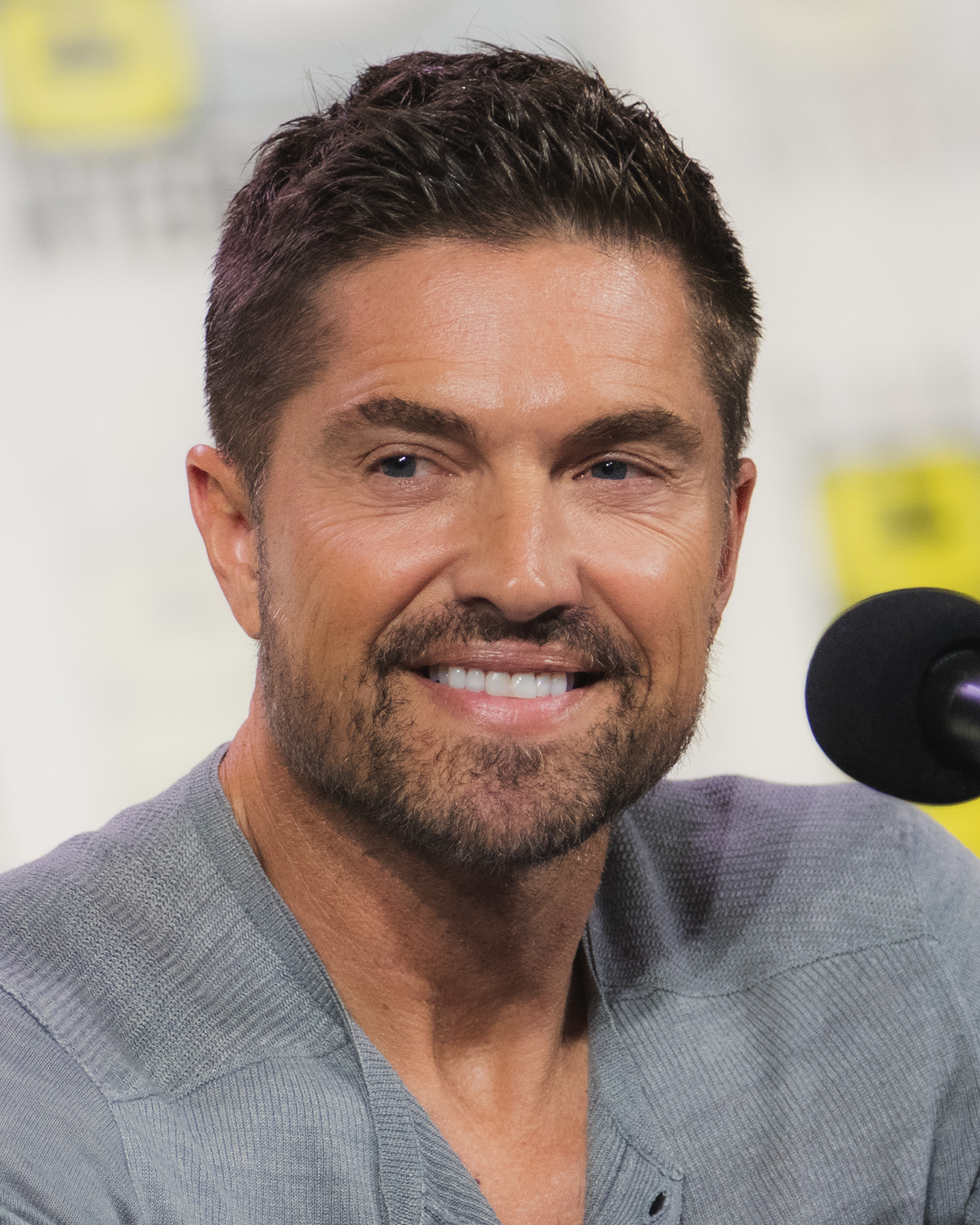
- Winter in 2026
- Born: Eric Barrett Winter; July 17, 1976 (age 50); La Mirada, California, U.S.
- Occupations: Actor, model
- Years active: 1999–present
- Spouses: Allison Ford (m. 2001; div. 2005) Roselyn Sánchez (m. 2008)
- Children: 2

Eric Barrett Winter (born July 17, 1976) is an American actor. He has appeared in the television roles as Sergeant Tim Bradford on the ABC show The Rookie (2018–present), Rex Brady on the NBC soap opera Days of Our Lives, FBI Special Agent Craig O'Laughlin on the CBS drama series The Mentalist (2010–2012), Dash Gardiner on the Lifetime fantasy-drama series Witches of East End (2013–2014), and The Good Doctor (2017–2018). His film appearances include Harold & Kumar Escape from Guantanamo Bay (2008), The Ugly Truth (2009), and Sundays at Tiffany's (2010).

== Early life ==
A native of the Los Angeles area, Winter was born in La Mirada and grew up in nearby La Puente. He graduated from Los Altos High School and UCLA with a degree in psychology. Initially he began modeling and auditioning for small roles in soap operas with the intention of only earning extra money for college tuition.

== Career ==
=== Modeling ===
Before his acting roles, Winter was a model and had some high-profile campaigns, such as one print campaign for Tommy Hilfiger. He appeared in a television commercial with Britney Spears for her fragrance, Curious.

=== Acting ===
Winter played the role of Rex Brady on the daytime soap opera Days of Our Lives from July 8, 2002, until July 26, 2005. After leaving Days of Our Lives, he had many small roles in television shows, such as CSI; Love, Inc.; Charmed; and Just Legal. He guest-starred on ABC Family's Wildfire for five episodes. His character, R.J. Blake, a bull-rider who dated the character of Dani Davis (played by Nicole Tubiola), was killed in the episode "Heartless", which aired originally on February 28, 2007. Winter also appeared on The Parkers in the episode "The Boomerang Effect". He appeared in an episode of the CBS series The Ex-List, and in the recurring role of Jason McCallister, the brother of Senator Robert McCallister (Rob Lowe) and the love interest of Kevin Walker (Matthew Rhys) on the ABC drama Brothers & Sisters. Winter was a regular on the short-lived CBS series Viva Laughlin and Moonlight. He appears in the feature films Harold & Kumar Escape from Guantanamo Bay (2008) and The Ugly Truth (2009).

In 2010, Winter starred as the character Michael Friend, the imaginary friend of Jane (Alyssa Milano) in the Lifetime television movie Sundays at Tiffany's.

From 2010 to 2012, Winter appeared in the CBS crime drama The Mentalist as FBI agent Craig O'Laughlin, the boyfriend and later fiancé of Amanda Righetti's character Grace Van Pelt. In 2012, he had a recurring role as Luke Lourd on the ABC comedy-drama series GCB. Winter appeared in the video game Beyond: Two Souls.

In 2013, Winter began starring in the Lifetime television series Witches of East End as Dash Gardiner. The series was canceled on November 4, 2014, after two seasons.

In October 2018, he began co-starring in the ABC police procedural drama The Rookie as Officer Tim Bradford. He has appeared in all eight seasons of this series starring Nathan Fillion.

== Personal life ==
He was married to actress Allison Ford from 2001 until 2005. He then dated Roselyn Sanchez for two years prior to their engagement in 2007, during a holiday vacation in Puerto Rico. The couple got married on November 29, 2008, at a historic fort in San Juan, Puerto Rico. Sanchez and Winter have two children, a daughter born in January 2012 and a son born in November 2017.

A fan of association football, Winter shares a friendship with Thibaut Courtois.

== Filmography ==
Film
Year	Title	Role	Notes
2004	Back When We Were Grownups	Hunk	Television film (Hallmark Hall of Fame)
2005	The Magic of Ordinary Days	Walter	Television film (Hallmark Hall of Fame)
2006	Break-In	Cameron	Television film (Lifetime)
2008	Harold & Kumar Escape from Guantanamo Bay	Colton Graham	
2009	The Ugly Truth	Colin Anderson	
2010	Sundays at Tiffany's	Michael Friend	Television film (Lifetime)
2012	Fire with Fire	Adam	
2014	Comet	Josh	
2015	Dead End		Short film; also producer
2017	Finding Santa	Ben	Television film (Hallmark)
2019	Taste of Summer	Caleb	Television film (Hallmark)

Television
Year	Title	Role	Notes
1999	Profiler	Todd	Episode: "Heads, You Lose"
1999	Undressed	Eric	2 episodes
1999	The Parkers	Anthony	Episode: "The Boomerang Effect"
2002	The Andy Dick Show	—N/a	Episode: "Andy's Tinseltown Chow-House"
2002	Charmed	Trevor	Episode: "Sam, I Am"
2002–2005	Days of Our Lives	Rex Brady	Role held: July 2, 2002 – August 1, 2005
2005–2006	Love, Inc.	Mike Smith	2 episodes
2005	CSI: Crime Scene Investigation	Julian Harper	Episode: "Room Service"
2006	South Beach	Ford Davenport III	Episode: "Every Day Above Ground Is a Good Day"
2006	Pepper Dennis	Connor Blanchard	Episode: "Heiress Bridenapped"
2006	Just Legal	Jared Kale	Episode: "The Rainmaker"
2007	Viva Laughlin	Peter Carlyle	Main cast; 2 episodes
2007	Wildfire	R.J. Blake	5 episodes
2007–2008	Brothers & Sisters	Jason McCallister	5 episodes
2008	Single with Parents	Charlie	Main cast; rejected ABC pilot
2008	Moonlight	ADA Benjamin Talbot	4 episodes
2008	The Ex List	Jake Turner	Episode: "Climb Every Mountain Biker"
2010–2012	The Mentalist	Craig O'Laughlin	8 episodes
2011	Weekends at Bellevue	Jared Knox	Main cast; rejected Fox pilot
2011	CSI: Miami	Joe Grafton	Episode: "Stiff"
2012	Scent of the Missing	Jake	Main cast; rejected TNT pilot
2012	GCB	Luke Lourd	5 episodes
2013	Rizzoli & Isles	Brandon Thomas 'B.T.' Sarron	Episode: "Built for Speed"
2013–2014	Witches of East End	Dash Gardiner; Dan	Main cast: 23 episodes 1 episode
2016	Secrets and Lies	Neil Oliver	8 episodes
2016–2017	Rosewood	Adrian Webb	9 episodes
2017	Las Reinas	Robert Ellison	Main cast; rejected ABC pilot
2017–2018	The Good Doctor	Dr. Matt Coyle	2 episodes
2018–present	The Rookie	Tim Bradford	Main cast; 144 episodes
2018–present	The Rookie	Jake "Dim" Butler	Episodes: "Day in the Hole" (2022) and "Double Down" (2022)
2021	Fantasy Island	Brian Cole	Episode: "The Romance & The Bromance"
2022	The Rookie: Feds	Tim Bradford	Episodes: "Face Off" and "To Die For"

Video games
Year	Title	Role	Notes
2013	Beyond: Two Souls	Ryan Clayton	Voice, 3D model and motion capture

Preceded by First	Rex Brady (role); 2002–05	Succeeded by Kyle Lowder
