= Daniel Di Tomasso =

Canadian actor and model

Daniel di Tomasso
- Born: 30 January 1983 (age 43); Montreal, Quebec, Canada
- Education: Middlebury College
- Occupation: Actor
- Years active: 2012–present

Daniel di Tomasso (born 30 January 1983) is a Canadian actor. In 2013, he began starring as a series regular in the television drama series Witches of East End, as Killian Gardiner. Di Tomasso also appeared on Beauty and the Beast, Grimm, CSI: Crime Scene Investigation, Timeless and the Amazon original series Good Girls Revolt. From 2016 through 2018, he joined the series Major Crimes as Detective Wes Nolan. In 2018 he appeared on Chicago Fire series. In 2019 and 2020, he appeared as Fletcher Myers in The CW reboot series Dynasty, and the Netflix show Ratched. He has also been cast in the shows The Republic of Sarah and Y: The Last Man, and in French Exit.

Before acting, he had a successful career as an international male model, shooting campaigns for a range of clients, including Armani collezioni and Giorgio Armani face cream, Vichy face cream, L’Oréal, Azzaro perfume and many more.

Di Tomasso was born and raised in Montreal. He speaks English, French and Italian.

== Filmography ==
Year	TV	Role	Notes	Ref
2012	Beauty and the Beast	Zeke	Episode 1.01 "Pilot"	
2013	CSI: Crime Scene Investigation	Santo	Episode 13.20 "Fearless"	
2013–2014	Witches of East End	Killian Gardiner; Henry; Bobby; Edgar Allan Poe	23 episodes	
2015	How Sarah Got Her Wings	Hank	Film	
2016	Grimm	Mark Nelson	Episode 5.15 "The Believer"	
2016	Blood is Blood	Crew	Film	
2016	Timeless	Noah	4 episodes	
2016	Good Girls Revolt	Chad	2 episodes	
2016–2018	Major Crimes	Detective Wes Nolan	Series regular 20 episodes	
2018	Chicago Fire	Lieutenant Zach Torbett	5 episodes	
2019	Brooklyn Nine-Nine	Young Gio Costa	Episode 6.02 "Hitchcock & Scully"	
2019–2020	Dynasty	Fletcher Myers	7 episodes	
2020	The Good Doctor	Zane Lumet	1 episode	
2020	Ratched	Dario Salvatore	1 episode	
2020	French Exit	Tom	Film	
2021	The Republic of Sarah	Weston Woods	5 episodes	
2021	Y: The Last Man	Mike	2 episodes	
2022	Station 19	Jeremy	2 episodes	
2022	Big Sky	Joe Walker	1 episodes	
2022-2024	CSI: Vegas	Trey	5 episodes	
