= Maggie Friedman =

American screenwriter and producer

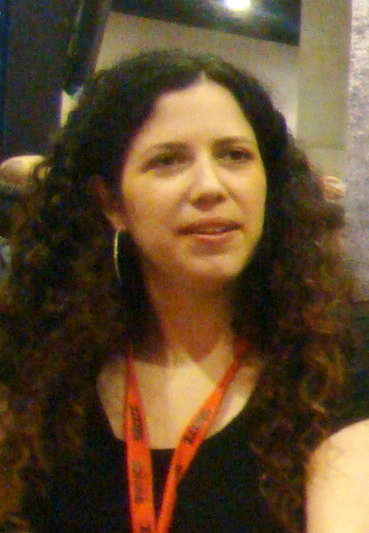
- Friedman in 2009
- Occupations: Producer, screenwriter

Maggie Friedman is an American screenwriter and producer. She was the showrunner and executive producer of the Lifetime television fantasy-drama series Witches of East End. She also developed and produced the short-lived ABC series Eastwick in 2009.

She proposed The Thousandth Floor (based on the series by Katharine McGee) for ABC, but it never went past the development stage. She has a production company, Curly Girly Productions.

== Credits ==
Year	Title	Credited as	Notes
1999	Wasteland	Writer	5 episodes
2001-2002	Once and Again	Co-producer and writer	17 episodes
2002-2003	Dawson's Creek	Producer and writer	3 episodes
2004	Jack & Bobby	Consulting producer and writer	
2004	Kat Plus One	Writer	
2005-2006	Related	Consulting producer and writer	18 episodes
2007	Spellbound	Executive producer and writer	
2009–2010	Eastwick	Executive producer and writer	13 episodes
2013–2014	Witches of East End	Executive producer and writer	23 episodes
2016–2017	No Tomorrow	Executive producer and writer	13 episodes
2021	Firefly Lane	Creator, executive producer and writer	20 episodes
