= Jenna Dewan =

American actress and dancer (born 1980)

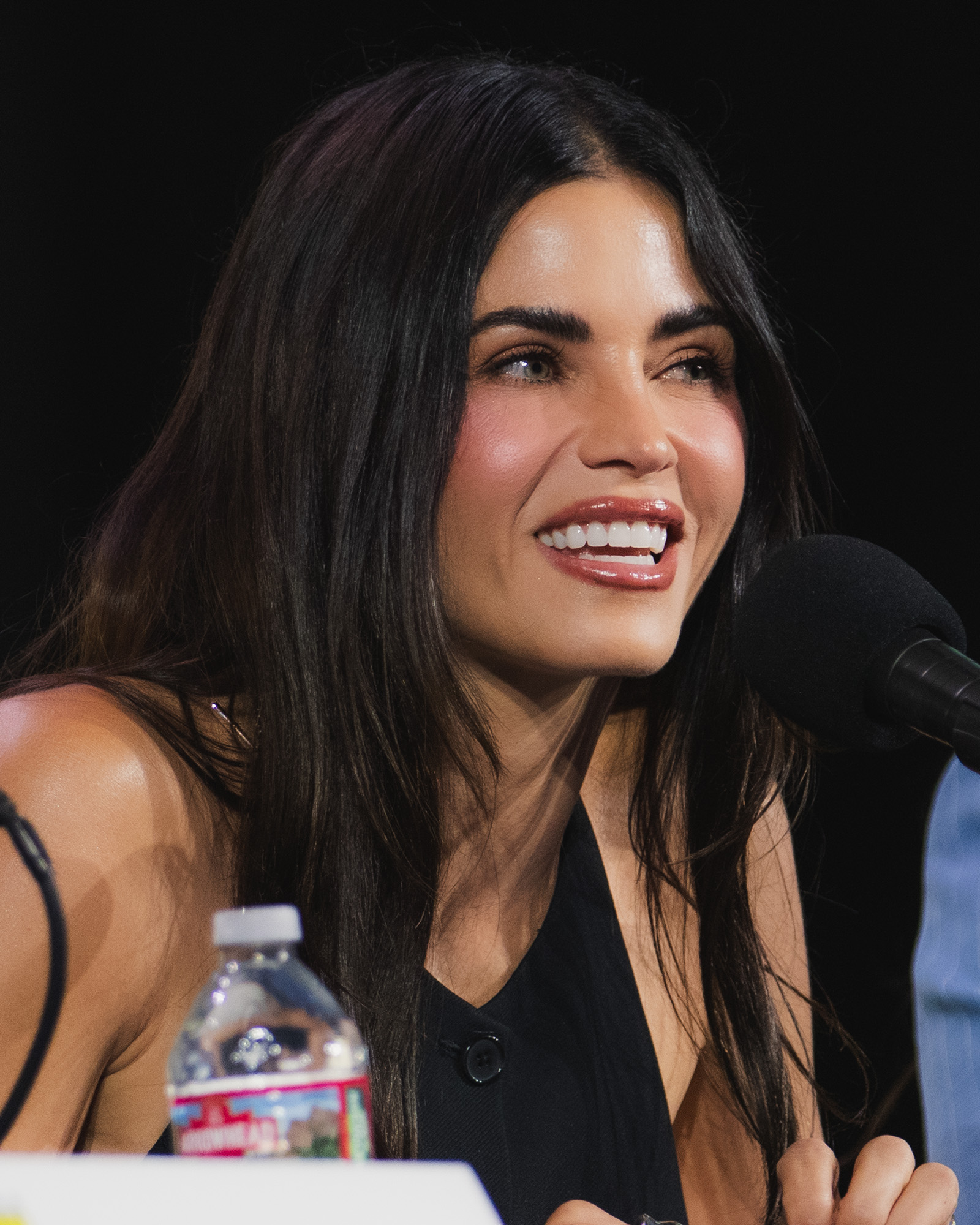
- Dewan in 2026
- Born: Jenna Lee Dewan; December 3, 1980 (age 45); Hartford, Connecticut, U.S.
- Other name: Jenna Dewan-Tatum
- Occupations: Actress; dancer
- Years active: 2000–present
- Spouse: Channing Tatum (m. 2009; div. 2019)
- Partner(s): Steve Kazee (2018–present; engaged)
- Children: 3

Jenna Lee Dewan (/dəˈwɑːn/; born December 3, 1980) is an American actress and dancer. She started her career as a backup dancer for Janet Jackson, and later worked with artists including Christina Aguilera, Pink, and Missy Elliott. She is known for her role as Nora Clark in the 2006 film Step Up. She has also starred on the short-lived NBC series The Playboy Club (2011) and had a recurring role on the FX series American Horror Story: Asylum (2012). She portrayed Freya Beauchamp on the Lifetime series Witches of East End (2013–14), Lucy Lane in The CW series Supergirl (2015–16) and Superman & Lois (2022–23), and Joanna in Soundtrack (2019) on Netflix. Dewan has hosted the reality television shows World of Dance (2017–18) and Flirty Dancing (2019) and served as a judge on Come Dance with Me (2022). Since 2021, she has appeared in a supporting role as Bailey Nune on ABC's The Rookie.

== Early life ==
Dewan was born December 3, 1980 in Hartford, Connecticut, the daughter of Nancy Smith (née Bursch) and Darryll Dewan, who was a running back on the 1972 Notre Dame football team. Her father is of Syrian-Lebanese and Polish descent and her mother is of Cornish, German and English ancestry.

As a child, Dewan moved frequently; she mentioned in an interview that she lived in seven cities before reaching the seventh grade. While attending high school at Notre Dame Preparatory School in Towson, Maryland, Dewan was a varsity cheerleader. She transferred to Grapevine High School in Grapevine, Texas. She was also a varsity cheerleader there and was voted prom queen during her senior year. She attended the University of Southern California and was a member of the California Gamma chapter of Pi Beta Phi.

== Career ==
=== Dancing ===
Dewan made her first appearance in Janet Jackson's "Doesn't Really Matter" video in 2000 and later in "All for You" and the All for You Tour in 2001. She credits working with Jackson for aiding her career, allowing her to later work with many other artists and giving her the experience necessary to co-star in the dance film Step Up. In 2016, Dewan modeled as the face of dancewear manufacturer Danskin in a campaign and photo shoot that captured and featured her athleticism as a dancer.

=== Acting ===
In 2006, Dewan co-starred with Channing Tatum in Step Up, as well as starring in Take the Lead that same year.

In August 2008, Dewan starred in the Lifetime made-for-television film Fab Five: The Texas Cheerleader Scandal which follows five rule-breaking teens. She portrayed the role of disciplinarian Coach Emma Carr. In November 2009, she appeared in the straight-to-DVD comedy American Virgin alongside Rob Schneider.

In March 2011, Dewan was cast in the NBC pilot of The Playboy Club. In May 2011, NBC picked up the series for a full season. She portrayed the role of Bunny Janie, a provocative Playboy bunny who works at the first Playboy Club in Chicago in 1961. The series premiered on September 19 to 5.2 million viewers with mixed reviews from critics. Due to low ratings, NBC cancelled the series after just three episodes in October 2011.

In November 2011, Dewan starred in the film The Jerk Theory. This was first released in Germany in 2009. It was later released in the United States in November 2011.

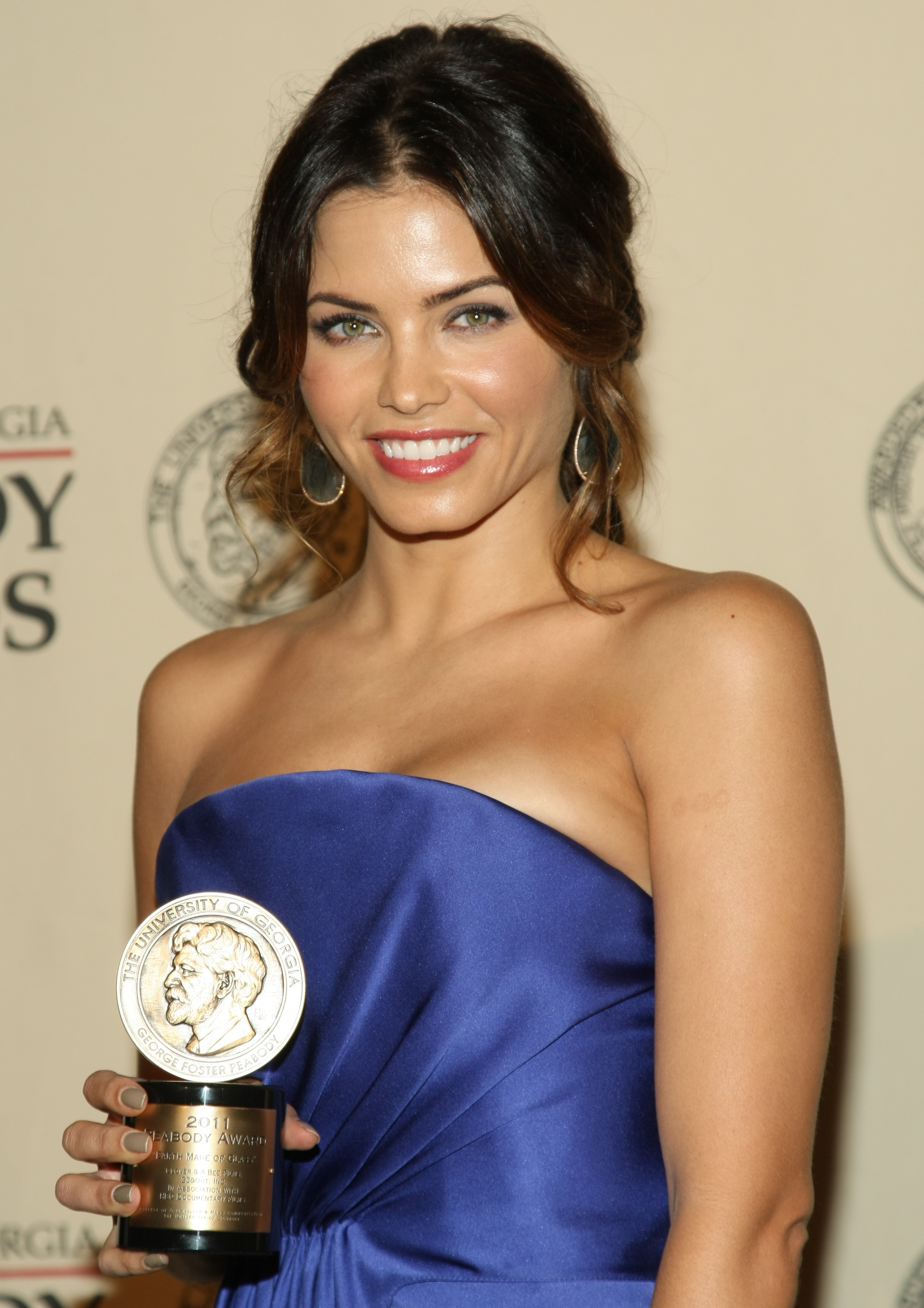
Dewan in 2012

Dewan appeared in the romantic-comedy film 10 Years, alongside her then-husband Channing Tatum, who also co-produced. The film was released on September 14, 2012. That same year, she appeared as Teresa Morrison in American Horror Story: Asylum, the second season of the horror television series.

In 2013, Dewan began starring in the Lifetime series Witches of East End as Freya Beauchamp, one of the lead characters. In late 2015, she began a recurring role in the CBS/CW series Supergirl as Lucy Lane, and reprised the role in its spinoff Superman & Lois. She also had a recurring role in FOX's The Resident. Dewan's 2019 projects include The Wedding Year, Berlin, I Love You and Soundtrack.

She joined the cast of ABC's The Rookie as Bailey in its third season, and was promoted to series regular in its fourth season.

In 2018, Dewan makes an appearance on the television series Seatbelt Psychic and receives a spooky reading from the famous medium Thomas John.

In 2022, Dewan starred and executive produced in the Lifetime film Let's Get Physical as part of the "Ripped from the Headlines" feature film. She portrays Sadie Smith who is loosely based on Zumba instructor Alexis Wright with the film inspired by Alexis' and her side prostitution gig.

=== 33andOut Productions ===
Along with friends Reid Carolin, Adam Martingano, Brett Rodriguez and Channing Tatum, Dewan started a production company called 33andOut Productions. Their first production is a documentary called Earth Made of Glass that follows Rwandan President Paul Kagame and genocide survivor Jean-Pierre Sagahutu. It premiered at the 2010 Tribeca Film Festival.

== Personal life ==
In 2006, Dewan started dating actor and dancer Channing Tatum after meeting on the set of their film Step Up. They married on July 11, 2009, in Malibu, California. They have one daughter, named Everly Elizabeth Maiselle Tatum born on May 31, 2013. On April 2, 2018, the couple announced that they were separating. Six months later, Dewan filed for divorce from Tatum. Their divorce was finalized in November 2019.

In October 2018, it was confirmed that Dewan was in a relationship with actor Steve Kazee. In February 2020, she and Kazee announced their engagement. Their first child, a son named Callum Michael Rebel Kazee was born on March 6, 2020. On January 17, 2024, it was confirmed via Dewan's Instagram that she and Kazee were expecting their second child. Their daughter, Rhiannon Lee Kathryn Kazee, was born on June 14, 2024.

== Filmography ==
=== Film ===
Year	Title	Role	Notes
2002	The Hot Chick	Bianca Salsa Girl	
2005	Waterborne	Devi	
2005	Tamara	Tamara Riley	
2006	Take the Lead	Sasha Bulut	
2006	Step Up	Nora Clark	
2006	The Grudge 2	Sally	
2008	Love Lies Bleeding	Amber	Direct-to-video
2008	The Jerk Theory	Molly Taylor	
2009	Falling Awake	Alessandra	
2009	The Six Wives of Henry Lefay	Sarah Jane	Direct-to-video
2009	American Virgin	Priscilla White	Direct-to-video
2010	Earth Made of Glass	—N/a	Documentary; executive producer
2011	The Legend of Hell's Gate: An American Conspiracy	Katherine Prescott	
2011	Balls to the Wall	Rachel Matthews	
2011	10 Years	Jess	
2011	Setup	Mia	Direct-to-video
2012	Slightly Single in L.A.	Hallie	
2019	Berlin, I Love You	Mandy	
2019	The Wedding Year	Jessica	

=== Television ===
Year	Title	Role	Notes
2001	Carmen: A Hip Hopera	Blaze Dancer	Television film
2004	Quintuplets	Haley	Episode: "Little Man on Campus"
2004	The Young and the Restless	Donna	Episode: "Episode #1.7935" & "#1.7938"
2005	Joey	Tanya	Episode: "Joey and the Break-Up"
2008	Fab Five: The Texas Cheerleader Scandal	Emma Carr	Television film
2009	Melrose Place	Kendra Wilson	Episode: "Windsor" & "Gower"
2011	The Playboy Club	Bunny Janie	Main cast
2012	She Made Them Do It	Sarah Jo Pender	Television film
2012–2013	American Horror Story	Teresa Morrison	Recurring cast: Season 2 (5 episodes)
2013–2014	Witches of East End	Freya Beauchamp	Main cast
2014	The Mindy Project	Brooke	Episode: "Be Cool"
2014	So You Think You Can Dance	Herself	Guest judge; episode: "Episode #11.12" & "#11.15"
2015	The Real Girl's Kitchen	Herself	Episode: "The H Word"
2015–2016	Supergirl	Lucy Lane	Recurring role: Season 1 (13 episodes)
2016	Lip Sync Battle	Herself	Competitor; episode: "Channing Tatum vs. Jenna Dewan-Tatum"
2016	No Tomorrow	Tuesday	Episode: "No Holds Barred"
2017	Hollywood Medium with Tyler Henry	Herself	Episode: "Jenna Dewan-Tatum/Emily VanCamp/Pauly D"
2017–2018	World of Dance	Herself	Main host: Season 1–2
2017–2018	Man with a Plan	Jen	Guest cast: Season 1–2
2018	Blaze and the Monster Machines	Little Bunny	Voice; episode: "Breaking the Ice"
2018–2019	The Resident	Julian Booth	Recurring cast: Season 2
2018–2022	Step Up	—N/a	Executive producer
2019	Soundtrack	Joanna	Main cast
2019–2020	Flirty Dancing	Herself	Main host; also producer
2020	Robot Chicken	College Girl #2 / Superglue Woman	Voice; episode: "Buster Olive in: The Monkey Got Closer Overnight"
2020–present	The Rookie	Bailey Nune	Recurring cast: Season 3; main cast: Season 4–present
2022	Let's Get Physical	Sadie Smith	Television film; also executive producer
2022	Come Dance with Me	Herself	Main judge
2022–2023	Superman & Lois	Lucy Lane	Recurring role: Season 2; guest role: Season 3 (6 episodes)
2023	Devil on My Doorstep	Natasha	Television film; also executive producer
2023	That's My Jam	Herself	Episode: "Jenna Dewan & JoJo Siwa vs. Nikki Glaser & Jay Pharoah"
2023	Celebrity Family Feud	Herself	Contestant; episode: "Episode #10.8"
2026	Dancing with the Stars	Herself	Contestant (season 35); 7th place

=== Music videos ===
Year	Title	Artist(s)
1999	"So Real"	Mandy Moore
2000	"He Wasn't Man Enough"	Toni Braxton
2000	"Upside Down"	A-Teens
2000	"Doesn't Really Matter"	Janet Jackson
2000	"Honey Bee"	Belle Perez
2001	"All for You"	Janet Jackson
2001	"You're No Good"	Ellie Campbell
2002	"Gossip Folks"	Missy Elliott
2003	"One Heart"	Celine Dion
2003	"Juramento"	Ricky Martin
2006	"(When You Gonna) Give It Up to Me"	Sean Paul featuring Keyshia Cole
2006	"Get Up"	Ciara featuring Chamillionaire
2010	"Not Myself Tonight"	Christina Aguilera
2019	"Happy Anniversary, All I Want for Christmas Is You!"	Mariah Carey

== Awards and nominations ==
Year	Award	Category	Work	Result
2007	Teen Choice Awards	Choice Movie: Dance Scene (with Channing Tatum)	Step Up	Won
2012	Peabody Award	Executive producer (with Channing Tatum)	Earth Made of Glass	Won
