= Witches of East End =

2011 novel by Melissa de la Cruz

- First edition cover
- Author: Melissa de la Cruz
- Language: English
- Series: The Beauchamp Family
- Genre: Contemporary fantasy Urban fantasy
- Publisher: Hyperion Books
- Publication date: June 21, 2011
- Publication place: United States
- Media type: Print (Hardback & e-book)
- Pages: 288 pp (first edition, hardback)
- ISBN: 1401323901
- Followed by: Serpent's Kiss

Witches of East End is a 2011 novel by the author Melissa de la Cruz and the first book in her Beauchamp Family series. It was published on June 21, 2011, by Hyperion Books and follows a family of Long Island witches struggling against dark forces conspiring against them. Witches of East End is de la Cruz's first adult novel. She said she wrote it with her Blue Bloods audience in mind because "many of them will soon be adults" and the book takes place in the same universe as the Blue Bloods series. Two sequels have been published, Serpent's Kiss (2012) and Winds of Salem (2013).

A television series adaptation, Witches of East End, debuted October 6, 2013, on Lifetime.

== Synopsis ==
Joanna Beauchamp has lived off the coast of Long Island for many centuries. She and her daughters, Freya and Ingrid, are immortal witches, cursed to spend the rest of their days without the use of their substantial powers due to the family's involvement in the Salem Witch Trials. Joanna has the power to heal and bring the dead back to life. Ingrid can tell the future and weave magical knotwork, while Freya can craft potions and charms. They have spent years hiding their true nature from others, something that provides no small amount of frustration because of how much they want to help others. It is only after Freya becomes engaged to the mysterious Bran (Branford) Gardiner (this character was renamed Dash in the TV series), and somehow becomes unwillingly infatuated with his brother Killian, that the Beauchamps seem to start breaking their curse, and slowly begin to cast magic once again. However, one small spell turns into several as the Beauchamps begin to fall into the routine of using magic. It is through this everyday usage that they discover that a mysterious presence is at work within the town, making the women barren, unleashing a strange silvery substance into the waters and ruining the local wildlife.

As Bran is continually away on trips to promote a charitable organisation run by his family, Freya is often left alone with Killian. This closeness eventually culminates in her once again sleeping with Killian after he assists her with a busy weekend at the pub she works at. While Freya deals with the guilt from her affair and the feelings that her affair with Killian brings up, Ingrid is conflicted by her own romantic feelings towards a local police officer, Matt Noble. Despite exhibiting an interest in her, Matt has begun dating a colleague, which irritates Ingrid greatly. The townspeople's ailments and the mysterious silver substance in the water eventually prompt Johanna to seek her estranged husband Norman (this character was renamed Viktor in the TV series) in New York, leaving her daughters alone to deal with a growing unrest in the town as a whole. The family is eventually charged with various crimes involving an attack on a local couple as well as the disappearance of a young woman who was interning at the mayor's office.

The Beauchamps eventually discover that the chaos stems from an old rivalry between Loki and Balder over Freya. It is also revealed that the entire family are gods from Norse mythology and that the silvery substance comes from the breaking down of the rifts between worlds. Freya initially believes that Killian is Loki, here to disrupt her relationship with Bran, only to discover that Bran is actually Loki and that his trips were not for charitable purposes but to encourage the destruction of the gates between the worlds. Freya and Ingrid travel into the rift to stop Loki, barely managing to succeed and return home. Once home, they are told that the Council has noticed their magic and that if they can avoid being convicted of the crimes against them, they will be free to practice magic once more. The Beauchamps are cleared of all charges, the intern's disappearance and death being a result of the mayor's obsession with her and the attack on a local couple being the actions of Bran. Freya and Ingrid have both begun relationships with their partners, with the book ending as Freya's brother approaching her for assistance in capturing Balder/Killian, who he claims tricked him into being imprisoned for the destruction of the Bifröst, which was done by Balder.

== Reception ==
Critical reception for Witches of East End was mostly positive, with Entertainment Weekly giving the book a rating of B+. The Los Angeles Times commented that the book was not perfect, but that it still managed to "cast a spell". Criticisms for the novel included a "clumsily executed resolution" and too much "arcane gobbledygook", while praise for the novel centered around the mixture of mythologies "gel[ling] magnificently" and de la Cruz's depiction of the Beauchamp women.

== Television series ==
In 2012, Lifetime announced their intentions to film a television pilot for Witches of East End with 20th Century Fox and Pacific 2.1. Filming for the pilot took place in Macon, Georgia, and Wilmington, North Carolina, with Julia Ormond starring as Joanna Beauchamp. Rachel Boston and Jenna Dewan-Tatum were later announced as being attached to the pilot, playing Ingrid and Freya respectively. The pilot loosely adapted the book's plot, with one change being that Freya and Ingrid are unaware of their magical powers or heritage.

After two seasons, Lifetime cancelled Witches of East End on November 4, 2014, due to low ratings. The series finale was aired on October 5, 2014. Fans of the show took to social media and began using the hashtag #RenewWitchesofEastEnd and started a petition that gained over 230,000 signatures.
