= Julia Ormond =

English actress (born 1965)

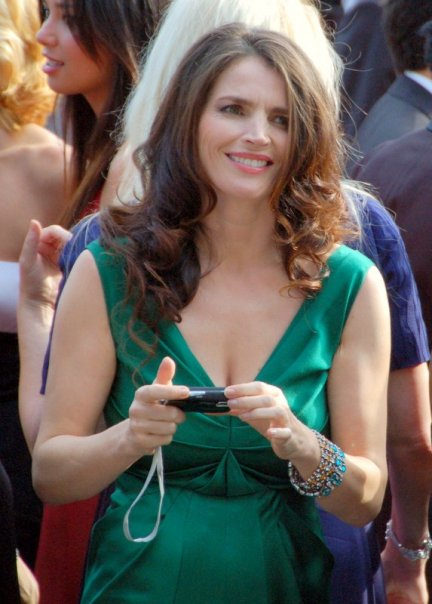
- Ormond at the 2008 Cannes Film Festival
- Born: Julia Karin Ormond; 4 January 1965 (age 61); Epsom, Surrey, England
- Occupation: Actress
- Years active: 1989–present
- Spouses: Rory Edwards (m. 1988; div. 1994) Jon Rubin (m. 1999; div. 2008)
- Children: 1

Julia Karin Ormond (born 4 January 1965) is an English actress. She rose to prominence during the 1990s by appearing in Legends of the Fall (1994), First Knight (1995) and Sabrina (1995). She won the Primetime Emmy Award for Outstanding Supporting Actress in a Limited or Anthology Series or Movie for her role in the HBO film Temple Grandin (2010). She is also known for her role in The Walking Dead: World Beyond (2020) as a main antagonist.

== Early life and education ==
Ormond was born in Epsom in Surrey, the daughter of Josephine, a laboratory technician, and John Ormond, a stockbroker. She has an elder sister and was five when her parents divorced. She has three younger, half-siblings from her father's second marriage. She has admitted to a fear of heights.

She was educated privately, firstly at Guildford High School and then at Cranleigh School, where early acting lead performances in Guys and Dolls and My Fair Lady began to draw attention.

After one year of art school, she transferred to Webber Douglas Academy of Dramatic Art, where she graduated in 1988.

== Career ==
Ormond first appeared on British television in the 1989 serial Traffik, about the illegal heroin trade from the far East to the streets of Europe. Ormond played the drug-addicted daughter of the lead character, a Home Office minister in the UK government engaged in combating heroin importation. This early role won glowing reviews.

Ormond appeared in several television films early in her career, such as Young Catherine (1991) and Stalin (1992). In 1993, she made her film debut in the lead role of an international movie, The Baby of Mâcon, and the following year co-starred in Legends of the Fall.

In 1995, Ormond played Queen Guinevere in First Knight and the title role in Sabrina. In 1997, she played a lead role in the thriller Smilla's Sense of Snow and, in 1998, she starred in the Russian film The Barber of Siberia.

Since the late 1990s, Ormond has appeared in indie and television movies and played supporting roles in films such as Iron Jawed Angels (2004), The Curious Case of Benjamin Button (2008), Che: Part One (2008), Albatross (2011), and My Week with Marilyn (2011).

Ormond has an independent production company, Indican Productions, based in New York City, and she executive-produced the Cinemax Reel Life documentary Calling the Ghosts: A Story about Rape, War and Women, which won a CableACE Award and a Robert F. Kennedy Journalism Award, and was an official selection of the Toronto and Berlin International Film Festivals.

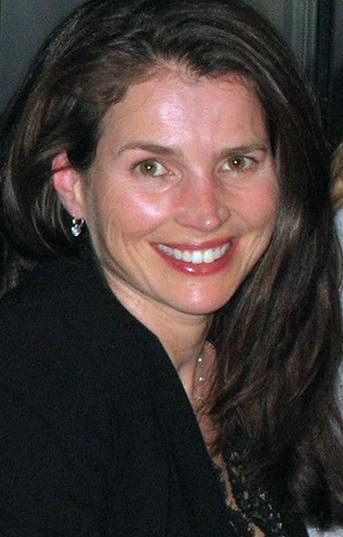
Ormond in 2005

On stage, she appeared in David Hare's My Zinc Bed, for which she received a 2001 Olivier Award nomination for Best Actress. On television, Ormond appeared as a guest star during the 2008–09 season of the CBS series CSI: NY. In 2010, she won an Emmy Award for her supporting role in the television film Temple Grandin. In 2011, Ormond guest starred in the tenth and final season of the series Law & Order: Criminal Intent.

In 2012, she played the part of Marie Calvet, mother to Megan Draper, in the series Mad Men, for which she was nominated for the Primetime Emmy Award for Outstanding Guest Actress in a Drama Series. From 6 October 2013 to 5 October 2014, Ormond starred in the television series Witches of East End as Joanna Beauchamp, one of the lead characters. In 2020 and 2021, she portrayed the primary antagonist, Elizabeth Kublek, in the AMC television series The Walking Dead: World Beyond.

== Personal life ==
In 1988, Ormond married Rory Edwards, an actor she had met while performing in a production of Wuthering Heights. The marriage ended in 1994. She married political activist Jon Rubin in 1999, and their child, Sophie, was born in the autumn of 2004. The couple divorced in 2008 and Ormond lives in Malibu, California.

Ormond has been fighting human trafficking since the mid-1990s, and in 2006 she entered into a partnership with the United Nations Office on Drugs and Crime to help increase awareness efforts. She is also an advocate for Transatlantic Partners Against AIDS, which attempts to raise awareness about AIDS in Russia and Ukraine, and is founding co-chairman of FilmAid International.

On 2 December 2005, Ormond was appointed a United Nations Goodwill Ambassador. Her focus has been on anti-human-trafficking initiatives, raising awareness about this modern form of slavery and promoting efforts to combat it. In her capacity as ambassador, Ormond has appeared as counsel to the United States House of Representatives, Committee on International Relations, Subcommittee on Africa, Global Human Rights and International Operations, and has travelled the world as an ambassador.

In 2007, Ormond established the Alliance to Stop Slavery and End Trafficking (ASSET).

On 4 October 2023, Ormond filed a lawsuit against Harvey Weinstein, alleging that he sexually assaulted her in 1995. The suit also seeks damages from The Walt Disney Company, Miramax, and Creative Artists Agency, claiming that these companies failed to protect her from his abuse. Ormand filed her suit under the Adult Survivors Act.

== Filmography ==
=== Film ===
Year	Title	Role	Notes
1993	The Baby of Mâcon	The Daughter	
1994	Nostradamus	Marie	
1994	Captives	Rachel Clifford	
1994	Legends of the Fall	Susannah Fincannon-Ludlow	
1995	First Knight	Guinevere	
1995	Sabrina	Sabrina Fairchild	
1997	Smilla's Sense of Snow	Smilla Jaspersen	
1998	The Barber of Siberia	Jane Callahan	
1999	Animal Farm	Jessie	Voice
2001	The Prime Gig	Caitlin Carlson	
2001	Varian's War	Miriam Davenport	
2003	Resistance	Claire Daussois	
2006	Inland Empire	Doris Side	
2007	I Know Who Killed Me	Susan Fleming	
2008	Surveillance	Elizabeth Anderson	
2008	Che	Lisa Howard	
2008	La Conjura de El Escorial	Ana de Mendoza, Princess of Eboli	
2008	The Curious Case of Benjamin Button	Caroline Fuller	
2008	Kit Kittredge: An American Girl	Margaret Kittredge	
2011	The Music Never Stopped	Dianne Daley	
2011	The Green	Karen	
2011	Albatross	Joa Fischer	
2011	My Week with Marilyn	Vivien Leigh	
2012	Chained	Sarah Fittler	
2013	The East	Paige Williams	
2017	Rememory	Carolyn Dunn	
2018	Ladies in Black	Magda	
2020	Son of the South	Virginia Durr	
2020	Reunion	Ivy	
2023	Home Education	Carol Glimm	
2025	Saurus City	Queen Rachel	Voice
2025	Fractured	Dr. Rose	

=== Television ===
Year	Title	Role	Notes
1989	Traffik	Caroline Lithgow	Miniseries
1989	Capital City	Alison	Episode: "Rainforest"
1990	The Ruth Rendell Mysteries	Nora Fanshawe	Episode: "The Best Man to Die: Parts 1, 2, & 3"
1991	Young Catherine	Catherine	Movie
1992	Stalin	Nadezhda Alliluyeva	Movie
1999	Animal Farm	Jessie (voice)	Movie
2001	Varian's War: The Forgotten Hero	Miriam Davenport	Movie
2004	Iron Jawed Angels	Inez Milholland	Movie
2005	Beach Girls	Stevie Moore	Miniseries
2007	Mr. and Mrs. Smith	Mother	Short
2008–09	CSI: NY	Gillian Whitford	3 episodes
2010	The Wronged Man	Janet Gregory	Movie
2010	Temple Grandin	Eustacia Grandin	Movie
2010	Nurse Jackie	Sarah Khouri	5 episodes
2011	Law & Order: Criminal Intent	Paula Gyson	7 episodes
2012–2015	Mad Men	Marie Calvet	5 episodes
2013	Exploding Sun	Joan Elias	Movie
2013–2014	Witches of East End	Joanna Beauchamp	Main role
2016–2017	Incorporated	Elizabeth Krauss	Main role
2017	Tour de Pharmacy	Adrianna Baton	Movie
2017	Howards End	Ruth Wilcox	Miniseries
2018	Forever	Marisol	2 episodes
2019	Gold Digger	Julia Day	Miniseries
2020–2021	The Walking Dead: World Beyond	Elizabeth Kublek	Main role; 11 episodes

== Awards and nominations ==
Year	Association	Category	Nominated work	Result
1992	Gemini Awards	Best Performance by an Actress in a Leading Role in a Dramatic Program or Miniseries	Young Catherine	Nominated
1995	ShoWest Convention	Female Star of Tomorrow		Won
2004	Gold Derby Awards	TV movie/Mini Supporting Actress	Iron Jawed Angels	Nominated
2006	Camerimage	Krzysztof Kieslowski Award		Won
2009	Broadcast Film Critics Association	Best Acting Ensemble	The Curious Case of Benjamin Button	Nominated
2009	Screen Actors Guild Award	Outstanding Performance by a Cast in a Motion Picture	The Curious Case of Benjamin Button	Nominated
2009	Gold Derby Awards	Ensemble Cast	The Curious Case of Benjamin Button	Nominated
2010	Primetime Emmy Awards	Outstanding Supporting Actress in a Limited or Anthology Series or Movie	Temple Grandin	Won
2011	Screen Actors Guild Award	Outstanding Performance by a Female Actor in a Miniseries or Television Movie	Temple Grandin	Nominated
2011	Western Heritage Awards	Television Feature Film	Temple Grandin	Won
2011	Capri, Hollywood	Capri Ensemble Cast Award	My Week with Marilyn	Won
2012	Primetime Emmy Awards	Outstanding Guest Actress in a Drama Series	Mad Men	Nominated

== See also ==
- List of British actors
- List of Primetime Emmy Award winners
