= Three Days of the Condor =

1975 film by Sydney Pollack

- Theatrical release poster
- Directed by: Sydney Pollack
- Screenplay by: Lorenzo Semple Jr.; David Rayfiel
- Based on: Six Days of the Condor by James Grady
- Produced by: Stanley Schneider
- Starring: Robert Redford; Faye Dunaway; Cliff Robertson; Max von Sydow
- Cinematography: Owen Roizman
- Edited by: Don Guidice; Fredric Steinkamp (supervising)
- Music by: Dave Grusin
- Production company: Dino De Laurentiis Corporation
- Distributed by: Paramount Pictures
- Release date: September 25, 1975 (US)
- Running time: 118 minutes
- Country: United States
- Language: English
- Budget: $7.8 million
- Box office: $41.5 million (US/Canada) (worldwide rentals: $32.7 million)

Three Days of the Condor is a 1975 American spy thriller film directed by Sydney Pollack and starring Robert Redford, Faye Dunaway, Cliff Robertson, and Max von Sydow. The screenplay by Lorenzo Semple Jr. and David Rayfiel was based on the 1974 novel Six Days of the Condor by James Grady.

Set mainly in New York City and Washington, D.C., the film is about a bookish CIA researcher who comes back from lunch one day to discover his co-workers murdered, then tries to avoid his own murder and outwit those responsible and understand their motives. The film was nominated for the Academy Award for Best Film Editing. Semple and Rayfiel received an Edgar Award from the Mystery Writers of America for Best Motion Picture Screenplay.

== Plot ==
Joe Turner is a bookish CIA analyst, codenamed "Condor", who works at the American Literary Historical Society in New York City, in reality a clandestine CIA office. The staff analyzes print media from around the world. Turner files a report to CIA headquarters on a thriller novel with strange plot elements that has been translated into several languages despite poor sales.

When Turner leaves to get lunch, armed men invade the office. Returning to find his co-workers dead, he leaves and contacts the CIA's New York headquarters in the World Trade Center. He is instructed to meet Wicks, his head of department, who will take him to safety. Turner insists Wicks bring somebody familiar since he had never met his departmental head. Wicks brings Sam Barber, a friend from their undergraduate years at City College and now a CIA administrator. The rendezvous is a trap and Wicks attempts to kill Turner, who wounds him before escaping. Wicks kills Barber, eliminating him as a witness, and blames Turner for both shootings. Wicks is later killed by an intruder in his hospital room.

Turner encounters Kathy Hale and forces her to take him to her apartment and holds her hostage as he works out what is happening. She comes to trust Turner, and they become lovers. Turner visits Barber's apartment where he encounters Joubert, a European who led the massacre of Turner's co-workers and had disconnected Wicks from life support at the hospital. Turner escapes when Joubert tries to shoot him, but Joubert tracks the license plate on Kathy's car. A hit man disguised as a mailman arrives at Hale's apartment, and Turner kills him.

With Hale's help, Turner abducts Higgins, the deputy director of the CIA's New York division, who identifies Joubert as a freelance assassin working for the CIA. Higgins later discovers that the hitman who attacked Turner worked with Joubert on a previous operation and both reported to Wicks.

Turner discovers Joubert's location using a hotel key found on the hit man. Turner, disguised as a phone company worker, uses the hotel switchboard to trace a phone call from Joubert and learn the name and address of Leonard Atwood, CIA Deputy Director of Operations for the Middle East. Confronting Atwood at gunpoint in his mansion near Washington, D.C., Turner suggests his own original report to CIA headquarters had exposed a rogue CIA operation to seize Middle Eastern oil fields.

Fearful of its disclosure, Atwood had privately ordered Turner's section eliminated. Atwood confirms the accusation as Joubert enters and unexpectedly kills him, staging it as a suicide. Atwood's superiors had hired Joubert to eliminate someone who was about to become an embarrassment, overriding Atwood's original contract for Joubert to kill Turner. Joubert suggests that the resourceful Turner leave the country and even become an assassin himself. Turner rejects the suggestion but heeds Joubert's warning that the CIA will try to eliminate him as another embarrassment, possibly entrapping him through a trusted acquaintance.

Back in New York, Turner has a rendezvous with Higgins near Times Square. Higgins describes the oilfield plan as a contingency "game" that was planned within the CIA without approval. He defends the project, suggesting when oil shortages cause a major economic crisis, the American people will accept harsh measures to keep their comfortable lives. Turner then reveals that he has given full details to The New York Times. Higgins retorts that Turner is about to become a very lonely man and questions whether the whistleblowing will really be published. "They'll print it," Turner defiantly replies. As "Condor" walks away, Higgins shouts after him, "How do you know?".

== Cast ==
- Robert Redford as Joe Turner (Condor)
- Faye Dunaway as Katherine "Kathy" Hale
- Cliff Robertson as Higgins
- Max von Sydow as Joubert
- John Houseman as Wabash
- Addison Powell as Leonard Atwood
- Walter McGinn as Sam Barber
- Tina Chen as Janice Chong
- Michael Kane as S.W. Wicks
- Don McHenry as Dr. Lappe
- Michael Miller as Fowler
- Jess Osuna as The Major
- Dino Narizzano as Harold
- Helen Stenborg as Mrs. Russell
- Patrick Gorman as Martin
- Hansford Rowe as Jennings
- Carlin Glynn as Mae Barber
- Hank Garrett as The Mailman
- James Keane as Store Clerk
- Sal Schillizzi as himself
- Dorothi Fox as Nurse
- Ernest Harden Jr. as Teenager

== Production ==
The film was shot on location in New York City (including the World Trade Center, 55 East 77th Street, Brooklyn Heights, The Ansonia, and Central Park), New Jersey (including Hoboken Terminal), and Washington, D.C. (including the National Mall).

== Soundtrack ==
Three Days of the Condor

Soundtrack album by Dave Grusin
- Released: August 1975
- Labels: Capitol (1975); DRG (2004 reissue)
- Producer: Neely Plumb

All music by Dave Grusin, except where noted.

1. "Condor! (Theme from 3 Days of the Condor)" 3:35
2. "Yellow Panic" 2:15
3. "Flight of the Condor" 2:25
4. "We'll Bring You Home" 2:24
5. "Out to Lunch" 2:00
6. "Goodbye for Kathy (Love Theme from 3 Days of the Condor)" 2:16
7. "I've Got You Where I Want You" 3:12 (Grusin/Bahler; sung by Jim Gilstrap)
8. "Flashback to Terror" 2:24
9. "Sing Along with the C.I.A." 1:34
10. "Spies of a Feather, Flocking Together (Love Theme from 3 Days of the Condor)" 1:55
11. "Silver Bells" 2:37 (Livingstone / Evans; sung by Marti McCall)
12. "Medley: a) Condor! (Theme) / b) I've Got You Where I Want You" 1:57

== Release ==
The film was released in September 1975, earning $8,925,000 in theatrical rentals in the United States and Canada by the end of the year. It earned rentals of $20 million in the United States and Canada from a gross of $41.5 million. It earned rentals of $32.7 million worldwide.

== Reception ==
Rotten Tomatoes, a review aggregator, reports that 88% of 56 surveyed critics gave the film a positive review, and the average rating was 7.4/10; the site's consensus is: "This post-Watergate thriller captures the paranoid tenor of the times, thanks to Sydney Pollack's taut direction and excellent performances from Robert Redford and Faye Dunaway." On Metacritic, the film has a weighted average of 63 out of 100 based on 11 reviews, indicating "generally favorable" reviews.

When first released, the film was reviewed positively by Vincent Canby, critic for The New York Times, who wrote that the film "is no match for stories in your local newspaper", but it benefits from good acting and directing. Variety called it a B movie that was given a big budget despite its lack of substance. Roger Ebert wrote, "Three Days of the Condor is a well-made thriller, tense and involving, and the scary thing, in these months after Watergate, is that it's all too believable."

John Simon wrote how the film differed from the book:

That the action has been relocated from sleepy Washington to furious New York City, almost all names have been changed, that the plot has been vastly over-complicated, is of lesser interest than a straight genre film, has been overloaded into an elegy of private, political, and finally, cosmic pessimism, a kind of national, if not metaphysical, guilt film to enchant the disenchanted.

French philosopher Jean Baudrillard lists the film as an example of a new genre of "retro cinema" in his essay on history in the now influential book, Simulacra and Simulation (1981):

In the 'real' as in cinema, there was history but there isn't any anymore. Today, the history that is 'given back' to us (precisely because it was taken from us) has no more of a relation to a 'historical real' than neofiguration in painting does to the classical figuration of the real...All, but not only, those historical films whose very perfection is disquieting: Chinatown, Three Days of the Condor, Barry Lyndon, 1900, All the President's Men, etc. One has the impression of it being a question of perfect remakes, of extraordinary montages that emerge more from a combinatory culture (or McLuhanesque mosaic), of large photo-, kino-, historicosynthesis machines, etc., rather than one of veritable films."

Some critics described the film as a piece of political propaganda, as it was released soon after the "Family Jewels" scandal came to light in December 1974, which exposed a variety of CIA "dirty tricks". In an interview with Jump Cut, Pollack explained that the film was written solely to be a spy thriller and that production on the film was nearly over by the time the Family Jewels revelations were made, so even if they had wanted to take advantage of them, it was far too late in the filmmaking process to do so. Despite both he and Redford being well-known political liberals, Pollack said they were only interested in making the film because an espionage thriller was a genre neither of them had previously explored.

I didn't want this picture to be judged; it's a movie. I intended it always as a movie. I never had any pretensions about the picture and it's making me very angry that I'm getting pretensions stuck on me like tails on a donkey. If I wanted to be pretentious, I'd take the CIA seal and advertise this movie and really take advantage of the headlines. Central Intelligence Agency, United States of America, Robert Redford, Faye Dunaway. And don't think it wasn't suggested — obviously, that's what advertising people do. We really put our foot down — Redford and I — to absolutely stop that.

=== KGB ===
According to former Soviet intelligence officer Sergei Tretyakov, the fictional clandestine office shown in Three Days of Condor convinced KGB generals to establish an equivalent office in Moscow, the Scientific Research Institute of Intelligence Problems (Russian: Научно-исследовательский институт разведывательных проблем).

== Awards and nominations ==
Wins

- Cartagena Film Festival: Golden India Catalina, Best Actor, Max von Sydow; 1976.
- David di Donatello Awards: Special David, Sydney Pollack, for the direction; 1976.
- Edgar Allan Poe Awards: Edgar; Best Motion Picture, Lorenzo Semple Jr. David Rayfiel; 1976.
- Kansas City Film Critics Circle Awards: KCFCC Award; Best Supporting Actor, Max von Sydow; 1976.
- Motion Picture Sound Editors: Golden Reel Award; Best Sound Editing - Sound Effects; 1976.

Nominations

- Academy Awards: Oscar; Film Editing, Fredric Steinkamp and Don Guidice; 1976.
- Cartagena Film Festival: Golden India Catalina; Best Film, Sydney Pollack; 1976.
- Golden Globe Awards: Golden Globe; Best Motion Picture Actress - Drama, Faye Dunaway; 1976.
- Grammy Awards: Grammy; Best Album of Original Score Written for a Motion Picture or Television Special, Dave Grusin; 1977.
- AFI's 100 Years...100 Thrills; 2001

== Legal action ==
In 1997, The Association of Danish Film Directors (Danske Filminstruktører), on behalf of the director Sydney Pollack, sued Danmarks Radio on the grounds that cropping the film for television compromised the artistic integrity of the original film and that broadcasting the film in a reduced screen version violated Pollack's copyright. The case was unsuccessful because the film rights to Three Days of the Condor were not actually owned by Pollack. The case is believed to have been the first legal challenge to the practice of panning and scanning widescreen films on screens with a 4:3 aspect ratio.

== Cultural legacy ==
- Joubert's musings in the penultimate scene (see under Plot above) on how Turner might be killed by the CIA are reprised almost word-for-word in the Seinfeld episode "The Junk Mail". The speech is used as a warning from Newman to Kramer about how the U.S. Postal Service will retaliate for Kramer's refusal to receive his mail.
- In Out of Sight, Jack Foley (George Clooney) and Karen Sisco (Jennifer Lopez) discuss the film's romantic subplot, which Sisco describes as dubious.
- The Marvel Comics superhero film Captain America: The Winter Soldier (2014) was inspired by this film and other sources as well as by the original comic book source material. The directors, the Russo brothers, admit this and say that Robert Redford's casting in their film was intended as an homage.
- Perhaps the most famous line in the film is Turner's challenge to Higgins, “You think not getting caught in a lie is the same thing as telling the truth?” Director Sydney Pollack has admitted to using variations of that line in three of his other films: Tootsie (1982), The Firm (1993), and The Interpreter (2005).
- The hacker Kevin Mitnick chose the Condor nickname after watching the film.
- R&B singer Amerie sampled the film's main theme "Condor!" for her 2002 song "Why Don't We Fall in Love".

== TV series ==
Condor, a television series based on the film and novel, premiered on June 6, 2018, on Audience. The series stars Max Irons and was created by Todd Katzberg, Jason Smilovic, and Ken Robinson. A second season premiered on June 9, 2020, on C More and RTÉ2.

== See also ==
- List of American films of 1975
- Conspiracy thriller
- United States Joint Publications Research Service, purportedly a model for the "American Literary Historical Society"
