= James Grady =

James Grady may refer to:

- James Grady (footballer) (born 1971), Scottish footballer
- James Grady (author) (born 1949), American writer and investigative journalist
