= Condor (TV series) =

2018 American thriller television series

- Genre: Thriller
- Created by: Todd Katzberg; Jason Smilovic; Ken Robinson
- Based on: Six Days of the Condor by James Grady; Three Days of the Condor by Lorenzo Semple Jr. & David Rayfiel
- Starring: Max Irons; Brendan Fraser; William Hurt; Leem Lubany; Angel Bonanni; Kristen Hager; Mira Sorvino; Bob Balaban; Constance Zimmer; Alexei Bondar; Jonathan Kells Phillips; Eric Johnson; Toby Leonard Moore; Ellen Wong
- Composer: Trevor Morris
- Country of origin: United States
- Original language: English
- No. of seasons: 2
- No. of episodes: 20

Production
- Executive producers: Jason Smilovic; Lawrence Trilling; David Ellison; Dana Goldberg; Marcy Ross; John Ward; Shane Elrod
- Producers: Sean Ryerson; Kate Regan; Brian Walsh
- Production locations: Toronto, Ontario, Canada
- Cinematography: Steve Cosens
- Editors: Wendy Hallam Martin; Reginald Harkema; Christopher Donaldson
- Camera setup: Single-camera
- Running time: 47–53 minutes
- Production companies: Apophasis Unproductions; Paramount Television Studios; Skydance Television; MGM Television

Original release
- Network: Audience
- Release: June 6 – August 15, 2018
- Network: Epix
- Release: June 9 – August 4, 2020

Condor is an American thriller television series based on the novel Six Days of the Condor by James Grady and its 1975 film adaptation Three Days of the Condor written by Lorenzo Semple Jr. and David Rayfiel. The series stars Max Irons and was created by Todd Katzberg, Jason Smilovic, and Ken Robinson and premiered on June 6, 2018 on Audience. In July 2018, the series had been renewed for a second season, although in January 2020, Audience announced it would be ending operations in its current format. The second season, already filmed at the time of the announcement, premiered on June 9, 2020, on C More and RTÉ2. In December 2020, its existing two seasons were picked up by Epix. They began premiering the second season on November 7, 2021.

== Premise ==
Joe Turner is an idealistic millennial who joins the CIA and hopes to reform it from within. He stumbles onto a secret plan that threatens the lives of millions. When professional killers massacre everyone in his office, Joe is forced into a battle with the most dangerous elements of the military-industrial complex.

== Cast and characters ==
=== Main ===
- Max Irons as Joe Turner, a CIA analyst whose fellow agents in the research and development office are all killed. Marko Vujicic portrays a young Joe Turner in a recurring role.
- William Hurt as Bob Partridge (season 1; guest season 2), Joe's paternal uncle by marriage and the man who recruited him into the CIA.
- Leem Lubany as Gabrielle Joubert (season 1; guest season 2), a former Mossad assassin working for the CIA operating as a freelancer.
- Angel Bonanni as Deacon Mailer (season 1), an assassin.
- Kristen Hager as Mae Barber, the wife of Joe's CIA colleague Sam.
- Mira Sorvino as Marty Frost (season 1), Bob's former lover who leads the official investigation into Joe's alleged crime.
- Bob Balaban as Reuel Abbott, the Deputy Director of the CIA.
- Toby Leonard Moore as Gordon Piper (season 2)
- Constance Zimmer as Robin Larkin (season 2)
- Alexei Bondar as Vasili Sirin (season 2)
- Isidora Goreshter as Kat Gnezdy (season 2)
- Jonathan Kells Phillips as Akardyr Volk (season 2)
- Eric Johnson as Tracy Crane (season 2)

=== Recurring ===
- Kristoffer Polaha as Sam Barber (season 1)
- Katherine Cunningham as Kathy Hale (season 1)
- Brendan Fraser as Nathan Fowler (season 1)
- Gage Graham-Arbuthnot as Jude Barber
- Sam McCarthy as Sam Barber Jr.
- Steve Belford as Manfredi (season 1)
- Jamie Robinson as The Watcher (season 1)
- Christina Moses as Sharla Shepard (season 1)
- Gabriel Hogan as Boyd Ferris (season 1)
- Ellen Wong as Sarah Tan (season 1)
- Michelle Vergara Moore as Carla Tizon (season 2)
- Kate Vernon as Lily Partridge
- Samer Salem as Ammar Nazari (season 1)
- Mouna Traoré as Iris Loramer (season 1)
- Dalmar Abuzeid as Caleb Wolfe (season 1)
- Melissa O'Neil as Janice (season 1)
- Kjartan Hewitt as Harold Floss (season 1)
- Jess Salgueiro as Jada
- Tennille Read as Ellie
- Jamie McShane as Gareth Lloyd
- John Bourgeois as Nathan's father (season 1)
- Taylor Thorne as Chloe Fowler
- Jean-Michel Le Gal as Elden Loramer (season 1)
- Ahmed Muslimani as Saeed Abu-Saeed
- Rita Volk as Polina (season 2)

=== Guest ===
- Julian Black Antelope as Mika ("What Loneliness")
- James McDougall as Tim Edward Mburu ("What Loneliness")
- Roger Dunn as Dr. Lappe ("What Loneliness")
- Kevin Claydon as Patrick ("The Solution to All Problems")
- Jennifer Foster as Sophia Fowler ("A Good Patriot")
- Raven Dauda as Hoyle ("A Good Patriot")
- Allison Hossack as Melanie Abbot ("No Such Thing")

== Episodes ==
Season	Episodes	Originally released		
Season	Episodes	First released	Last released	Network
1	10	June 6, 2018	August 15, 2018	Audience
2	10	June 9, 2020	August 4, 2020	Epix

Each episode's title is borrowed from a quote, which is displayed along with its author.

=== Season 1 (2018) ===
No. overall	No. in season	Title	Directed by	Written by	Original release date
1	1	"What Loneliness ("What loneliness is more lonely than distrust?" – George Eliot)"	Lawrence Trilling	Story by : Jason Smilovic, Todd Katzberg, and Ken Robinson; Teleplay by : Jason Smilovic & Todd Katzberg	June 6, 2018
Joe Turner, an analyst for IEP, a front company of the CIA, is called into the situation room when an algorithm he developed identifies an Arab-American man, Ammar Nazari, as 12 per cent likely to commit a terrorist attack. Turner is uncomfortable with his program being used in this way and considers resigning, but then hears that the FBI has found biological agents on the suspect, revealing he was apparently planning to release pneumonic plague at a Washington, DC stadium. Turner's team are hailed as heroes, and as they investigate the thwarted attack, Turner identifies suspicious purchases of pharmaceutical stocks before the incident caused demand for ciprofloxacin to soar. Informed of the discovery, covert operative Nathan Fowler who organized the false flag attack on the stadium, sends a team of assassins to kill Turner and his team, but he manages to escape onto a train. A U.S. diplomat smuggles the plague bacteria into Saudi Arabia in a diplomatic bag.
2	2	"The Solution to All Problems ("Death is the solution to all problems. No man, no problem." – Joseph Stalin)"	Lawrence Trilling	Jason Smilovic & Todd Katzberg	June 13, 2018
Turner narrowly escapes assassins Gabrielle Joubert and Deacon Mailer, who conducted the attack at his office. Turner calls his uncle, Bob Partridge, the head of the Joint Terrorism Task Force unit investigating the massacre. Partridge arranges to meet Turner in a park, but Joubert and Mailer arrive. Turner is rescued by his best friend, Sam Barber, who is feeling guilt over his own involvement in the conspiracy, but Joubert and Mailer catch up and shoot them both, killing Barber. Partridge is replaced as unit chief by Marty Frost, who releases information to the media that Turner is wanted for the murder of his colleagues. Turner, who was wearing a bulletproof vest when he was shot, turns up at the house of Kathy Hale, a former Tinder date. When they both see the news story naming Turner as a suspect, he detains her to prevent her calling the police as he tries to process the day's events.
3	3	"A Good Patriot ("To be a good patriot one must become the enemy of the rest of mankind." – Voltaire)"	Lawrence Trilling	Jason Smilovic & Todd Katzberg	June 20, 2018
Mae Barber struggles to cope with her husband's death, and is questioned by the agency about Turner. Nathan Fowler spends the day with his daughter. Frozen out of the investigation, Partridge has FBI agent Sharla Shepard—girlfriend of Sarah Tan—assigned to the task force, then asks her to feed him information. At Hale's house, Turner uses her computer to investigate his situation. Joubert pays a hacker to track Turner, and kills him when he fails. Shepard finds Hale's messages on the Tinder app on Turner's phone, and heads to her house with the task force. As Partridge warns them of the raid, Hale sprays Turner with pepper spray then tries to escape, but is knocked unconscious. The task force arrived to find Joubert there, and Turner and Hale gone. Mailer has flashbacks to his torture at the hands of the Saudis, and is sent to Riyadh to carry out an operation there.
4	4	"Trapped in History ("People are trapped in history and history is trapped in them." – James Baldwin)"	Andrew McCarthy	Jason Smilovic & Todd Katzberg	June 27, 2018
Turner carries Hale to the house of the neighbor whose cat she was feeding, as the task force arrives to raid her house, then binds and gags her. Suspecting Turner has been tipped off by someone on the team, Frost and Abbott order a cleanup team to search everyone on the task force, but Shepard manages to hide the phone from Frost. Turner unties Hale from the restraints and apologizes for hurting her. He tells her of how when he was at MIT, he and his girlfriend Janice visit his uncle, Bob Partridge, for Thanksgiving dinner. When they return home, they are arrested along with their roommate, Caleb Wolfe, who has hacked into the MIT server. Partridge arranges for Turner to be released, and recruits him into the CIA. As Hale watches TV, she sees Wolfe, now an information activist and hacker, on the news, where he claims that IEP was a CIA front which developed the algorithm that identified Ammar Nazari.
5	5	"A Diamond With a Flaw ("Better a diamond with a flaw than a pebble without" – Confucius)"	Andrew McCarthy	Jason Smilovic & Todd Katzberg	July 11, 2018
Hale obtains a phone for Turner to call his ex-girlfriend Janice, to ask her arrange a meeting with Caleb Wolfe. Janice is reluctant to help Turner, but later gives him an encoded address. Joubert and Partridge follow Janice, hoping she will lead them to Turner, but she is on to their pursuit. Mailer checks into a hotel in Riyadh, where he bugs the hall and another room, in which he infects the sleeping occupant with the plague bacteria. Shepard attends an AA meeting, then breaks her two-year stretch of sobriety. She picks up a man in a bar, but changes her mind—beating him when he doesn't stop touching her. Turner turns up at the address Janice gave him. A man arrives and strip searches him, then tells him to take pills to knock him out while he takes him to Wolfe. Turner refuses, but the man forces him to swallow the pills, and he wakes up two hours later in a locked room.
6	6	"No Such Thing ("There is no such thing as paranoia. Your worst fears can come true at any moment." – Hunter S. Thompson)"	Kari Skogland	Jason Smilovic & Todd Katzberg	July 18, 2018
Turner meets Caleb Wolfe at his safehouse, and they trade information about the IEP killings. Unbeknownst to either, Wolfe's source for his info on IEP was Sam Barber's boss, Elden Loramer. Mae struggles to cope with Sam's death, and had flashbacks to bonding with other "agency wives" at social events. Task force agent Boyd Ferris follows Joubert to Hale's house, where they find her hiding in the closet. They hold her in the house, waiting for Turner to return, until Hale raises Ferris's suspicions about why Joubert won't call it in. They draw their guns on each other, and Joubert shoots Ferris, while Hale manages to escape. She and Turner flee in a car, but Joubert fires at the vehicle, killing Hale.
7	7	"Within a Dark Wood ("I came to myself within a dark wood where the straight way was lost." – Dante Alighieri)"	Kari Skogland	Jason Smilovic & Todd Katzberg	July 25, 2018
Turner leaves Hale's body by a river. Partridge makes contact with Shepard and tells her Joubert is responsible for her girlfriend's death. Mae prepares for Sam's funeral and wake, with the conspirators bugging her house before the event. At the wake, neighbor and fellow agency wife Iris tells Mae that she has proof Sam was involved with the death of her husband, Elden Loramer. Turner, who has been hiding in Jude Barber's treehouse, flees pursued by Shepard when discovered by Jude. Shepard catches up with Turner, but he convinces her to trust him and she hides him in her trunk, raising Joubert's suspicions. In Saudi Arabia, Mailer arrives in Mecca for the Hajj.
8	8	"A Question of Compromise ("To be or not to be is not a question of compromise. Either you be or you don't be." – Golda Meir)"	Andrew McCarthy	Jason Smilovic & Todd Katzberg	August 1, 2018
Shepard handcuffs Turner to her radiator to give her a head start as she goes after Joubert. Partridge follows the trail of the conspiracy, locating a video of Ammar Nazari speaking with chemical weapons expert Abu-Saeed, although he believes this was a chance meeting and Nazari was framed for the stadium attack. Mae's friend Iris is tortured and killed by Joubert for the video of Fowler and Barber ordering her husband's death. A CIA team captures Abu-Saeed, and he tells Partridge he is dying from the plague himself. Fowler confronts Gareth Lloyd for putting the operation in jeopardy. When Lloyd goads Fowler, he kills Lloyd's girlfriend, then Lloyd, and then himself.
9	9	"Death is the Harvest ("Life, life is the tillage, and death is the harvest according." – Walt Whitman)"	Jason Smilovic	Jason Smilovic & Todd Katzberg	August 8, 2018
Mailer prepares to release the plague at the Hajj, and has flashbacks to his torture at the hands of Ibrahim Salah. Mae finds Iris's body, and Abbott threatens her family to convince her to give up the memory card with Iris's evidence. Turner goes to see Janice, and they head back to Wolfe's safehouse. Shepard follows Joubert to her home to kill her, but is stopped by Frost. Partridge breaks into Abbott's home to kill him, but Abbott convinces him there is no way to stop the plot and there is only one way he can save Turner. Joubert enters Wolfe's safehouse, killing everyone except Turner. Driving away, she tells Turner the contract on his life has been cancelled, and he drives the car off the embankment.
10	10	"Mistrust Blossoms ("Trust dies but mistrust blossoms" – Sophocles)"	Jason Smilovic	Jason Smilovic & Todd Katzberg	August 15, 2018
Shepard and Frost follow Joubert to the safehouse, where Frost turns on Shepard and shoots her, although Shepard manages to fire back. Turner leaves the unconscious Joubert in the crashed car, and contacts Mae through her eldest son. Mae abducts a wounded Frost from the hospital, and Turner takes her to Partridge's cabin. Frost outlines how she blackmailed Loramer and the conspirators, with an "insurance policy" to release the details of the plot to the press if she is killed. Turner reluctantly kills her, triggering the release. He and Partridge go over Abbott's head to the CIA director, who agrees to pay Joubert to eliminate Mailer in Saudi Arabia. A year later, Turner is living in Florence, Italy with his girlfriend. He is contacted by Joubert, who tells him he is "the one that got away". Turner hacks Abbott's laptop and is planning to enact revenge against him.

=== Season 2 (2020) ===
No. overall	No. in season	Title	Directed by	Written by	Original release date
11	1	"Exile is a Dream ("Exile is a dream of glorious return." – Salman Rushdie)"	Andrew McCarthy	Jason Smilovic & Todd Katzberg	June 9, 2020
Joe Turner is travelling through Europe, putting the events of the last season behind him. Despite his uncle, Bob Partridge, trying to reach out to him, he ignores his attempts. When he finally decides to call Partridge back, CIA deputy director Reuel Abbott answers and explains that Partridge has supposedly committed suicide. Turner reluctantly accepts the mission. He secures the CIA's asset, Vasili Sirin, and brings him back to the States. Sirin allegedly sits on information about a mole inside the agency. En route on the highway, their car is attacked by masked gunmen and Sirin's fate is left in question. Abbott decides to abort Turner's mission and asks him to go back to what he was doing. Mae Barber, Sam Barber's widow, is implied to have started a relationship with Tracy Crane, who's the father of Sam Jr.'s friend, Anders. After being at a party, Mae's friend, Gordon Piper, is revealed to have knowledge about the CIA mole.
12	2	"If It Serves a Greater Good ("Lying is wrong, son, but if it serves a greater good, it's OK." – Aldrich "Rick" Ames)"	Andrew McCarthy	Michael Oates Palmer	June 9, 2020
It is revealed that armed men disguised as paramedics had tried to abduct Vasili Sirin, although he had been able to escape. The disguised men are later revealed to have been hired by CIA Deputy Director Reuel Abbott to secure Sirin, as he reveals to the Director of National Intelligence Robin Larkin. Having recovered in the hospital, Joe Turner returns home and stays with Mae Barber and her children. He visits his uncle's house, where he discovers files on Gordon Piper before getting knocked out by an unknown assailant. When he regains consciousness, the house is filled with guests following Partridge's funeral. Sam Barber Jr. notably spills cola on Abbott's shoes, out of anger, thinking Abbott was involved in his father's death. Turner takes a walk to Piper's house at night and observes him and his wife, Eva. On his way back to Mae's house, he is picked up by Tracy Crane, who is revealed to be working in intelligence. He takes him to see Larkin, who wants to know what Turner knows about Sirin and the mole.
13	3	"A Former KGB Man ("There is no such thing as a former KGB man." – Vladimir Putin)"	Ali Selim	Daria Polatin	June 16, 2020
Turner reveals what he knows about Sirin and the mole to Robin Larkin, but his information is limited. Larkin offers him to probe Gordon Piper, and later puts up surveillance after Turner eventually accepts the task. Turner spends time with Mae and the Pipers, going to church and helping with a children's birthday party. Mae secretly reveals to Eva Piper what she knows about Abbott's possible involvement in her husband's death. Eva advises her to make contact with Senator Sidney Thrush, who led a congressional inquiry into Abbott. Mae asks Eva for time to consider. Turner spends the rest of the evening with Gordon on his boat. He later meets Larkin again and expresses that Piper is the perfect candidate for a foreign asset. Sam Barber Jr. plots an even more noticeable revenge against Abbott. Sirin, badly injured, returns to a former colleague, Kat Gnezdy.
14	4	"Not What He Thinks He Is ("Man is not what he thinks he is, man is what he hides." – André Malraux)"	Ali Selim	Mac Marshall	June 23, 2020
Sam Barber Jr. lures a SWAT team to Reuel Abbott's house, excusing it as that Abbott held his wife hostage. Gordon Piper decides to use alternative methods to gain money for which he owes in debt for a dinner the family once had. Unbeknown to him, the money is sorted out by Volk and Kat Gnezdy. Gnezdy treats Sirin and lets him go. Joe decides to open up to Mae about why he came back, which he explains accurately excluding major details. He later takes Sam Jr. to the spot where his father picked him up following an escape in the previous season. In return, Sam Jr. tells him that he called SWAT on Abbott, which they both agree was a stupid action.
15	5	"Out Of His Exile ("Everyone must come out of his exile in his own way." – Martin Buber)"	Alexis Ostrander	Jacob Held	June 30, 2020
Turner rejoins Larkin in the surveillance and investigation into Gordon Piper, seeking to find out if Piper was really framed. He bases this on one picture of Piper, which Partridge had before Turner was knocked out. Despite this, Crane is convinced of the contrary. Kat Gnezdy gets Sirin to another safe house, away from her own home. Turner turns his attention towards the stolen ambulance, which Crane puts out a search for. Larkin seeks out information from her asset, which is revealed to be Polina, a colleague of Gnezdy. Based on her intel, Larkin reveals to Turner and Crane that the man Piper got money from, Lior, is a suspected Israeli turned double agent for the Russians. Crane decides to take Piper in after Larkin's arrest warrant is granted. In rapid succession, Volk executes Lior Lishcott, while Crane does likewise to Matty, one of the gunmen that kidnap Sirin.
16	6	"An Offer Of Enrollment ("One does not look twice at an offer of enrollment in an elite force." – Kim Philby)"	Alexis Ostrander	Jason Smilovic & Todd Katzberg & Amy Suto	July 7, 2020
Crane meets with Volk, who he is revealed to be working for as a double agent. Larkin begins the questioning of Gordon Piper, who was recently arrested. The case takes a turn when Abbott arrives and reveals that Piper worked as a mole. While following the questioning of Piper, Crane gets flashbacks to when his wife left him and when he was recruited by Volk soon after. Turner tracks down the ambulance used in the kidnapping of Sirin, finding it in a car rental that sells vehicles used in movie productions. He tracks down the buyer of the ambulance, only to find him dead at his residence, and being confronted by his friend, who reveals they both work for the agency. An FBI agent arrives and saves Turner. Abbott reveals that records show no sign of said agent working for the FBI. Mae decides to talk to Senator Thrush about Abbott. Turner arrives at the train station, looking for Sirin. He is instead met by Kat Gnezdy, who tells him she will get him to Sirin.
17	7	"A Perspective, Not the Truth ("Everything we hear is an opinion, not a fact. Everything we see is a perspective, not the truth." – Marcus Aurelius)"	Rachel Leiterman	Jason Smilovic & Todd Katzberg & Rachel Pologe	July 14, 2020
Flashbacks reveal that Volk and Sirin used to be friends. Following the events of the previous episode, it's revealed that Volk was disguised as the FBI agent that saved Turner, and put a tracker in him, following him leaving the scene. It's also revealed that Volk followed Turner to Union Station, where Turner met Kat Gnezdy. She gives Turner an address for where he can find Sirin. Volk picks up Gnezdy, unaware that she aided Turner. Crane and Mae leave town, and spend time looking at the stars, eating and visiting Crane's house, which he kept secret from his family. Turner finds Sirin at a house, and they escape after being ambushed by Volk and Gnezdy. Sirin reveals that Volk had told him how he recruited an asset in the CIA while being too drunk. They arrive at a ranch, where they are caught by the home owners. They also discover that the tracker was placed on Turner himself and not his car. The home owners decide to help them, and help them into the forest before Volk and Gnezdy arrive. Despite spotting Sirin in the forest, Gnezdy decides to let them go. Sirin reveals to Turner that he bluffed to save his own life, and that he doesn't know who the CIA mole is. As he orders Turner to leave, Volk's reinforcements arrive on a nearby forest road.
18	8	"The Road We Take ("We often meet our destiny on the road we take to avoid it." – Jean De La Fontaine)"	Rachel Leiterman	Story by : Jason Smilovic & Todd Katzberg and Daria Polatin; Teleplay by : Jason Smilovic & Todd Katzberg	July 21, 2020
Volk's reinforcements arrive and starts to search the forest with drones and sniffer dogs. Turner and Sirin flee to a river and find their way to a motel, where they temporarily stay for the time being. Larkin's informant inside the SVR, Polina, starts to suspect that Volk and his people are onto her and sends out an SOS to Larkin. She, alongside Gnezdy are invited for a lunch with Volk, where Polina is poisoned and dies in Gnezdy's arms in an attempt to save her. Polina lastly admits that she is the mole inside the SVR. Crane calls Volk and tells him he wants out, and following a call with Turner, tells Volk that Sirin never knew the CIA mole's name. Crane spends time with Mae Barber, while Abbott declares war on the Barber family, by having Sam Barber Jr. arrested by police. Turner turns to Gnezdy for help.
19	9	"The Greatest Hazard ("The greatest hazard of all, losing one's self, can occur very quietly in the world, as if it were nothing at all." – Søren Kierkegaard)"	Jason Smilovic	Jason Smilovic & Todd Katzberg	July 28, 2020
Piper is visited by his wife Eva, who encourages him to continue fighting on the inside and that they will sue the state. An anonymous source leaks the story of Piper's imprisonment to the press, making Larkin question whether or not Abbott could be behind it. Mae Barber manages to get her son released from prison and confronts Abbott directly at his home, demanding he'll drop the charges against her. Abbott gives in, and is forced to tell the truth to Holly, who leaves him. Turner takes Sirin to Mae's house, unaware that she and Crane came home earlier then expected, forcing him to reveal the truth to her, so she can treat Sirin's wounds. Turner presents a plan to Gnezdy about luring Volk to an address, subduing him and forcing him to tell who the mole is. Despite her agreeing with his plan, she double crosses him and tells the truth to Volk. Crane visits Larkin, who is overwhelmed by the Piper case. Piper killed himself by ingesting peanuts. After a drink, Crane slips in his words, revealing he knew that Polina was Larkin's mole inside the SVR, and he kills her and disposes of her body before telling Turner he has found a safe house.
20	10	"Not Necessarily to Lose ("To change is not necessarily to lose one's identity; to change sometimes is to find it." – George Brown Tindall)"	Jason Smilovic	Jason Smilovic & Todd Katzberg	August 4, 2020
At a concert, Turner gives Gnezdy the address to get Volk to. He and Sirin arrive there first and escape via boat to Crane's boat house after Volk calls in reinforcements to search the house. Volk is subdued by one of this reinforcements before being taken to the boat house. At the boat house, he is tortured for information about the mole by Turner, Sirin and Gnezdy. Crane loosens his restraints, allowing Volk to attack Gnezdy, before killing Sirin and wounding Crane, before getting killed himself. Turner and Gnezdy give matching statements to the CIA and SVR respectively. Mae breaks up with Crane after he comes back from the hospital. He retires from the agency and meets Gnezdy. Abbott retires from the CIA, and is killed by Gabrielle Joubert before he can testify before Congress. Turner confronts Crane at his house. He reveals that Gnezdy has become his asset, and that he knows Crane is the mole, before killing him. Gnezdy takes over Volk's role in the SVR, and Turner joins the CIA.

== Production ==
=== Development ===
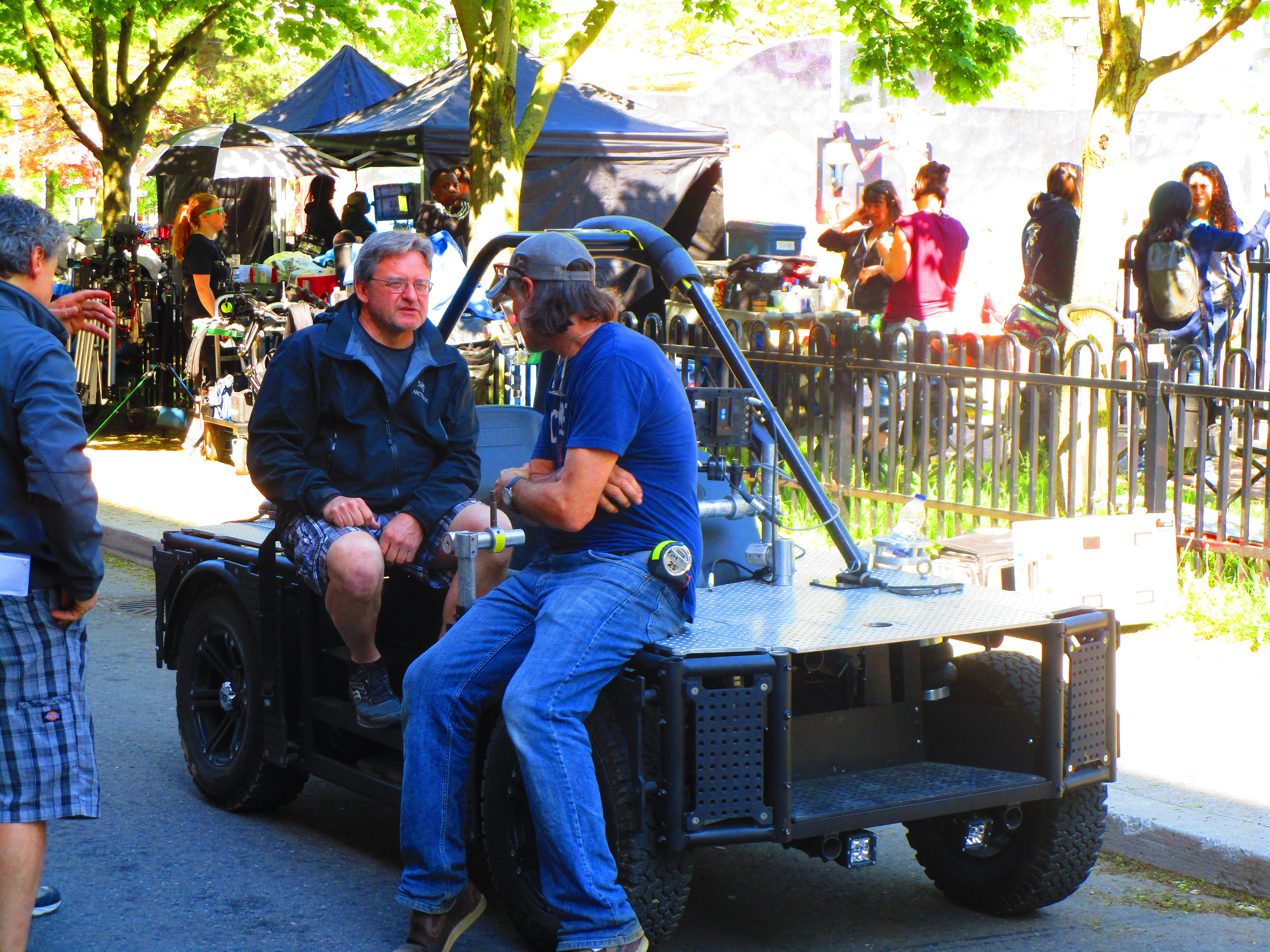
The crew used a special vehicle to carry cameras for car chases.

On May 13, 2016, it was announced that DirecTV had given the production a series order. Production companies involved with the series were reported to include Skydance Television and MGM Television. On February 6, 2017, it was announced that Jason Smilovic and Todd Katzberg would write the series. Smilovic would also act as showrunner and executive produce alongside Katzberg, David Ellison, Dana Goldberg, and Marcy Ross. On March 27, 2017, Andrew McCarthy mentioned in an interview with Parade that he would serve as an executive producer for the series and direct a few episodes. On April 6, 2017, it was announced that Lawrence Trilling would direct the series' first three episodes and act as an executive producer.

On July 27, 2018, it was announced during the annual Television Critics Association's summer press tour that the series had been renewed for a second season. In February 2022, a third season was announced to be in development.

=== Casting ===
On February 6, 2017, it was announced that Max Irons had been cast in the series' lead role. In April 2017, it was reported that Brendan Fraser, William Hurt, Bob Balaban, Leem Lubany, Kristen Hager, and Angel Bonanni had joined the main cast and that Mira Sorvino, Christina Moses, Katherine Cunningham, Gabriel Hogan, Kristoffer Polaha, and Kate Vernon had been cast in recurring roles. On August 25, 2017, it was announced that Mouna Traoré and Ellen Wong had joined the cast in a recurring capacity.

=== Filming ===
Principal photography for the series was expected to last from April 23 to August 15, 2017 in Toronto, Ontario, Canada. Filming primarily took place at Cinespace Film Studios' Kipling Avenue facility. On May 30, 2017, Jack Lakey, a Toronto Star columnist, contacted the city's film liaison office, after Condor crew members allegedly bullied local residents. In Lakey's follow-up article the next day he quoted film industry workers, who supported those working on the production. Filming for the second season began on April 29, 2019 and ended on August 29, 2019.

== Release ==
Promotional poster featuring Max Irons as Joe Turner.

=== Marketing ===
On February 22, 2018, Audience released a behind-the-scenes video for the series.

=== Premiere ===
On March 10, 2018, the series held its official premiere in Austin, Texas at the annual South by Southwest Film Festival. Audience also hosted an interactive experience called "Condor Headquarters" during the festival. Guests to the exhibit were offered the chance to participate in authentic CIA activities such as skill tests, physical and digital technology tactics, lie detection, and environmental analysis. The experience also allowed guests to win prizes and screen exclusive content from the series.

In June 2018, the series was screened at the annual ATX TV Festival in Austin, Texas. A question-and-answer session followed the screening featuring director/executive producer Lawrence Trilling and cast members Leem Lubany, Katherine Cunningham, Kristen Hager, and Kristoffer Polaha.

== Reception ==
On the review aggregation website Rotten Tomatoes, the series holds an 86% approval rating with an average rating of 6.67 out of 10 based on 14 reviews. The website's critical consensus reads: "Condor never aspires to be a realistic depiction of spy games – instead, it excels at evoking a uniquely 21st century brand of paranoia with its slick concept and propulsive pacing." Metacritic, which uses a weighted average, assigned the series a score of 66 out of 100 based on 7 critics, indicating "generally favorable reviews".

In a positive review, IndieWire's Ben Travers praised the series calling it "a Smartly Expanded Adaptation" and saying that it was "a solid spy story that updates the right elements without tarnishing old treasures."
