= Kidnapped (American TV series) =

American crime drama television series

- Genre: Crime drama
- Created by: Jason Smilovic
- Starring: Jeremy Sisto; Carmen Ejogo; Delroy Lindo; Linus Roache; Will Denton; Timothy Hutton; Mykelti Williamson; Dana Delany
- Composer: W.G. Snuffy Walden
- Country of origin: United States
- Original language: English
- No. of seasons: 1
- No. of episodes: 13

Production
- Executive producers: Jason Smilovic; Michael Dinner; Sarah Timberman; Carl Beverly; Ken Topolsky
- Running time: 42 minutes
- Production companies: Dark & Stormy Productions; Rooney McP Productions; 25 C Productions; Sony Pictures Television

Original release
- Network: NBC
- Release: September 20, 2006 – August 11, 2007

Kidnapped is an American crime drama television series created by Jason Smilovic and produced by Sony Pictures Television, which aired on NBC from September 20, 2006, to August 11, 2007.

== Overview ==
The series premise planned to feature a new kidnapping each season, with a core continuing cast who investigated the kidnappings, and additional cast members who changed each season, consisting of the kidnappers and the people affected. The show told the story from the discrete points of view of the victim, the parents, the investigators, and the kidnappers.

The core cast included ex-FBI operative Knapp (Jeremy Sisto) offering privately contracted services to retrieve kidnapping victims, his technologically adept coordinator and assistant Turner (Carmen Ejogo), and FBI Agent Latimer King (Delroy Lindo).

Timothy Hutton and Dana Delany co-starred as an affluent New York couple whose teenage son Leopold (Will Denton) is abducted. Other characters included Gutman (Mädchen Amick) and "The Accountant" (James Urbaniak), Leopold's bodyguard (and King's brother-in-law) Virgil Hayes (Mykelti Williamson), and FBI agents played by Linus Roache and Michael Mosley.

== Ratings ==
Nielsen ratings for the premiere were 6.0, with total viewers of 7.5 million, and adults 2.8 in the 18–49 demographic. The second episode scored a 2.1 in the 18–49 demographic, with a total of 6.3 million viewers.

== Scheduling ==
Kidnapped was originally scheduled to air on Tuesdays at 9:00 pm ET in the U.S., as announced in a presentation made by NBC in advance of the normal upfront presentations. This placed Kidnapped in a timeslot against the popular Fox TV series House. Because of this and similar problems with other shows, in an unusual move on May 25, 2006, NBC announced significant changes to its fall schedule, moving Kidnapped to a Wednesday at 10:00 pm, ET timeslot.

NBC and Netflix then announced, two months before the start of the 2006 fall season, that the pilot episodes of Kidnapped and Studio 60 on the Sunset Strip (another new series) would be made available to Netflix subscribers on a specially issued preview DVD. The pilot for Kidnapped was also made available online at MSN.

Premiering on September 20, 2006, Kidnapped started airing on NBC on Wednesday nights. After the third episode performed poorly in the ratings, NBC announced that the show would be completed and aired within the 13 episodes of the original production order, instead of the usual 22 of a full TV season, and that the show would be rescheduled to Saturdays at 9 pm, ET, starting October 21.

After airing the fifth episode, NBC pulled the show from their schedule. NBC then announced that the remaining eight episodes would be shown online at the NBC website until completion of the story, with a new episode posted each Friday. The series finale was posted online on December 22, 2006, and the series was not renewed by NBC. The entire series was released on DVD on April 24, 2007.

On June 24, 2007, NBC began to air the eight remaining unaired episodes of the series on overnight Sunday night/Monday mornings as part of the network's NBC All Night lineup, after Meet the Press, replacing the usual late night airing of Best of Dateline NBC at that time. This depended on local affiliates, however, as some stations only carry portions of the lineup, and some do not air NBC All Night at all.

The series also aired repeats on Universal HD.

== Cast ==
=== Main ===
- Timothy Hutton as Conrad Cain
- Dana Delany as Ellie Rand Cain
- Will Denton as Leopold Cain
- Jeremy Sisto as Lucian Knapp
- Carmen Ejogo as Turner
- Delroy Lindo as Latimer King
- Mykelti Williamson as Virgil Hayes
- Linus Roache as Andrew "Andy" Archer

=== Recurring ===
- Michael Mosley as FBI Agent Atkins
- Lydia Jordan as Alice Cain
- Olivia Thirlby as Aubrey Cain
- Doug Hutchison as James Devere
- James Urbaniak as The Accountant
- Anthony Rapp as "Larry" Kellogg
- Mädchen Amick as Gutman
- Giancarlo Esposito as FBI Agent Vance
- Ricky Jay as Roger Prince
- Otto Sanchez as Otto
- Terry Kinney as James Sullivan

== Episodes ==
No.	Title	Directed by	Written by	Original release date
1	"Pilot"	Michael Dinner	Jason Smilovic	September 20, 2006
The son of millionaire Conrad Cain and his wife Ellie, 15-year-old Leopold, is kidnapped on his way to school. The boy's bodyguard, Virgil, is left for dead at the scene. Cain, who has a lot to hide in his past, hires P.I. Knapp and Knapp's partner Turner, both of whom work outside the system, to find his son. The system, represented by FBI Special Agent Latimer King and Agent Andy Archer, are also investigating the case.
2	"Special Delivery"	Michael Dinner	Jason Smilovic	September 27, 2006
Something from Conrad's past may have a connection to Leopold's kidnapping. Conrad meets with his father to explore this. A package arrives which makes the Cains wonder if Leopold was the only child targeted for kidnapping. Knapp heads to Brown University to find Aubrey.
3	"Sorry Wrong Number"	Michael W. Watkins	David Greenwalt & Jason Smilovic	October 4, 2006
At the insistence of Knapp and King the Cains host their annual charity ball, so that people won't figure out Leopold has been kidnapped.
4	"Number One with a Bullet"	Michael Pressman	David J. Burke	October 21, 2006
The kidnappers target Leopold's bodyguard Virgil, once again, as he prepares for surgery. Conrad is questioned by the police regarding something from his past. Ellie joins an anonymous group for parents of kidnapped children. Knapp looks into the bullet that was used to shoot Virgil.
5	"Burn, Baby, Burn"	Oz Scott	Duppy Demetrius	October 28, 2006
Knapp and King figure out the name of the suspect, and race to find the mastermind. Leopold tries to get to a cell phone before the battery dies.
6	"My Heart Belongs to Daddy"	Nelson McCormick	Jan Oxenberg	June 24, 2007
Ellie's father Benjamin Rand steps in and takes over, and he is willing to do anything to get his grandson back, but will it cost him his own life? Meanwhile, Knapp and King keep searching into the Cain's past, while Conrad is arrested.
7	"Front Page"	Darnell Martin	Sam Catlin	June 30, 2007
The kidnapping is made public by the media.
8	"Gone Fishin'"	Jean de Segonzac	David J. Burke	July 7, 2007
Virgil tries to find Leopold on his own. The kidnappers are forced to move after being questioned by the Mexican police. Conrad goes to the funeral for the man he's accused of killing.
9	"Do Unto Others"	Peter Werner	Duppy Demetrius & Hilly Hicks Jr.	July 14, 2007
A mission to uncover the truth leads to a dangerous game.
10	"Impasse"	Alex Chapple	Jan Oxenberg & Jason Smilovic	July 21, 2007
Snipers threaten King's daughter as Knapp interrogates a suspect.
11	"Mutiny"	Jace Alexander	Tyler Mitchell	July 28, 2007
Information regarding Swiss bank accounts is revealed and, in turn, implicates a family friend in Leo's kidnapping. There is a disagreement among the group choreographing the kidnapping; some members defect and present their own demands to the Cains. Leo's captors make their own arrangements; a family friend's connection is revealed.
12	"Acknowledgement"	Tony Goldwyn	Jason Smilovic	August 4, 2007
Forces converge in Mexico; an FBI internal investigation focuses in on a culprit; Ellie uncovers a clue.
13	"Resolution"	Jeff Bleckner	Jason Smilovic	August 11, 2007
Atkins makes a discovery; the real mole is uncovered; loose ends are tied up; things were not as they seemed.
