= I'm Dangerous Tonight =

1990 film by Tobe Hooper

- Promotional poster
- Genre: Horror
- Based on: "I'm Dangerous Tonight" by Cornell Woolrich
- Screenplay by: Bruce Lansbury; Philip John Taylor
- Directed by: Tobe Hooper
- Starring: Mädchen Amick; Corey Parker; Daisy Hall; R. Lee Ermey; Dee Wallace; Natalie Schafer; Mary Frann; Jason Brooks; Anthony Perkins
- Music by: Nicholas Pike
- Country of origin: United States

Production
- Executive producer: Boris Malden
- Producers: Bruce Lansbury; Philip John Taylor
- Cinematography: Levie Isaacks
- Editor: Carl Kress
- Running time: 92 minutes

Original release
- Release: August 8, 1990

I'm Dangerous Tonight is a 1990 American made-for-television supernatural horror film directed by Tobe Hooper and starring Mädchen Amick, Corey Parker, R. Lee Ermey and Anthony Perkins. It made its debut on USA Network on August 8, 1990. It was loosely inspired by the novella of the same name by Cornell Woolrich.

== Plot ==
At Tiverton College, an ancient sacrificial altar is delivered to Dr. Jonas Wilson. Inside is a carcass wearing a red cloak. Wilson dons the cloak and murders a security guard, then kills his wife before committing suicide.

Psychology professor Gordon Buchanan gives a lecture on animism in honor of Wilson. One of his students, Amy, whose parents are deceased, is living with her aunt Martha and is the primary caretaker of her invalid grandmother.

When Amy goes to Wilson's estate sale and purchases a trunk he owned for the school play, she sees the cloak and has visions of the murders. After she brings the trunk to rehearsal, Eddie, who is playing Mercutio, tries the cloak on, gets into a violent swordfight with a fellow actor and is fired from the production. Amy retreats with the cloak and later awakens in the night, inexplicably compelled to fashion it into a dress.

Eddie invites Amy to the Easter dance; she declines, due to her caretaking responsibilities, but ultimately goes anyway, wearing her newly made dress. While her cousin Gloria is in the ladies room, Amy dances with Gloria's boyfriend, Mason, and then leaves with him. They make out, but when he removes her dress, she is no longer under the spell and thus apologizes and leaves.

Upon returning home, Amy's grandmother tries to wrestle the dress from her and falls down the stairs, dying instantly. When Gloria and Martha later confront her in anger, Amy realizes her grandmother was trying to warn her about the dress's powers.

After the funeral, Gloria apologizes for her anger. Sensing Mason is about to propose to her, Gloria asks Amy to lend her the dress for the occasion, but Amy says she disposed of it. Gloria later finds it in Amy's closet.

After Gloria finally sleeps with Mason, she expects he will propose but is instead told that he has been drafted for the San Francisco 49ers. When he leaves to shower, she puts on the dress and then murders him. Amy and Eddie make out in his car and are rammed by Gloria driving Mason's truck. After a chase down the road, Gloria drives off a cliff and dies when she is consumed by fire.

Buchanan later tells Amy of Dr. Wilson's theory that garments worn in religious rituals are capable of possession, drawing out the worst qualities in the possessed. Captain Aikmen presses Amy for information on the deaths, to no avail. The coroner's assistant, Wanda Thatcher, commits several murders after finding the dress. Amy leafs through Wilson's animism book at the library and finds Wanda's contact information inside.

Buchanan tells Amy that he knows about her acquisition of Wilson's cloak, but when he asks of its whereabouts, she says it was incinerated in Gloria's crash. Amy contacts Wanda, who lies about its incineration. After Amy gains access to Wanda's apartment, Wanda suspects she has been there and contacts the coroner for Amy's address.

Amy tells Captain Aikman she feels the dress is supernatural and possessing Wanda. Buchanan calls Amy at home to tell her that the dress has not been destroyed as she finds her aunt Martha has been murdered. Wanda attacks Amy, and while Amy initially escapes, Wanda eventually knocks her unconscious. Amy awakens to find she is wearing the dress. Eddie enters and says he murdered Wanda and then put Amy into the dress, although it now appears to be powerless over her. When she rejects Eddie's advances and leaves, he angrily pursues her into a shed, but she removes the dress and convinces him to help her destroy it.

Captain Aikman explains that they did not kill Wanda, and that she actually died from the fall. Amy then destroys the dress by placing it into a woodchipper.

At Wanda's burial site, Amy throws the remains of the dress into her open grave. Amy later tells Buchanan she destroyed the dress and buried it with Wanda, and although he says he intended to do the same, he later digs up her grave and unearths the dress's remains.

== Cast ==
- Mädchen Amick as Amy
- Corey Parker as Eddie
- Daisy Hall as Gloria
- R. Lee Ermey as Lt. Ackman
- Natalie Schafer as Grandmother
- Jason Brooks as Mason
- William Berger as Jonas
- Mary Frann as Martha
- Dee Wallace as Wanda (as Dee Wallace Stone)
- Anthony Perkins as Buchanan
- Lew Horn as Coroner
- Stuart Fratkin as Victor
- Dan Leegant as Frank
- Jack McGee as Landlord
- Edward Trotta as Joey
- David Carlile as Matt
- Felicia Lansbury as Librarian
- Henry C. Brown as Anchorman
- Ellen Gerstein as Server
- Ivan Gueron as Romeo
- Juan Garcia as Enrique
- Frank Dielsi as City Worker
- Richard Penn as Paramedic
- Xavier Barquet as Punk No. 1
- Matthew Walker as Punk No. 2
- Robert H. Harvey as Janitor
- Bill Madden as Tybalt

== Production and release ==
I'm Dangerous Tonight was produced for the USA Network in 1990. The film's story was based on a short story by Cornell Woolrich. It was aired by USA on August 8, 1990. On July 26, 2022, Kino Lorber released the film on Blu-ray with special features.

== Reception ==
From contemporary reviews, Ken Tucker of Entertainment Weekly gave the film a D ranking, declaring, "The only reason I watched this hokey-sounding TV movie was to see Mädchen Amick, the much-abused Shelly, creepy Leo's wife, on Twin Peaks." Tucker noted that Amick "goes from sedate college student to murderous temptress with ease", while concluding that "The rest of the movie is sanitized horror-movie piffle, with Anthony Perkins in a cameo role as — get this — a normal person." Scott Williams writing for the Associated Press stated that the film "is well-directed even if it isn't particularly well-written", and that Hooper "creates some scary images and is still prodding the material for thrills even when the script has run out of steam." Mike Duffy of the Detroit Free Press gave the film two stars, stating it was a "modest, melodramatic tale of the supernatural", adding that viewers should "turn off the brain. [It] won't work any other way."

In his book Eaten Alive at a Chainsaw Massacre: The Films of Tobe Hooper (2009), author John Kenneth Muir found the film "never quite as scary or as violent as fans know Tobe Hooper can make it", adding that "It isn't bad by any means, just fairly innocuous TV material." In a 2022 review of the Blu-ray for Slant Magazine, Rocco T. Thompson compared the film to Peter Strickland's In Fabric (2018), adding, "The crewmembers behind the camera—especially cinematographer Levie Isaacks—do what they can to stretch the modest TV budget, but little of Hooper's presence is felt on screen."

== Bibliography ==
- Binion, Cavett. "I'm Dangerous Tonight (1990)". AllMovie. Archived from the original on July 8, 2012.
- Duffy, Mike (August 8, 1990). "USA Dishes Melodrama 'Tonight'". Detroit Free Press.
- Muir, John Kenneth (2015). Eaten Alive at a Chainsaw Massacre: The Films of Tobe Hooper. McFarland. ISBN 978-1476613352.
- Thompson, Rocco T. (July 27, 2022). "Review: Tobe Hooper's I'm Dangerous Tonight on KL Studio Classics Blu-ray". Slant Magazine.
- Tucker, Ken (August 17, 1990). "I'm Dangerous Tonight". Entertainment Weekly.
- Williams, Scott (August 8, 1990). "'I'm Dangerous Tonight' elicits B-movie thrills". Austin American-Statesman. p. B10.
