= Tanya Robertson =

- Sleepwalkers character
- Created by: Stephen King
- Portrayed by: Mädchen Amick

In-universe information
- Occupation: High school student
- Family: Donald Robertson (father); Helen Robertson (mother)
- Significant other: Charles Brady (ex-boyfriend; deceased)

Tanya Robertson is a fictional character from the 1992 fantasy horror film Sleepwalkers. The character, created by the author Stephen King and portrayed by Mädchen Amick, serves as the protagonist of the 1992 film. In the film, Tanya is a sexually curious virgin who unwittingly falls for a Sleepwalker—nomadic, shapeshifting energy vampires who feed off the life force of virginal women.

== Character arc ==
In Sleepwalkers, Tanya Robertson is first seen working the night shift at an empty local theater dancing but is startled by Charles Brady, who is a new student in her creative writing class. He offers to take her home but she declines because her father picks her up from work. The next day, during her creative writing class, she is mesmerized by the story that Charles reads in front of the class. Charles seems romantically interested in Tanya but this is only because he needs her life-force for both himself and his mother, Mary, who is starving. Tanya is unaware of the real reason Charles is interested in her. At first, it seems that Charles has genuinely fallen in love with her. On their first date, Charles attempts to drain her life-force while kissing her. Tanya defends herself from Charles by bashing his head with her camera, scratching his face, and plunging a corkscrew into his left eye, which merely seem to annoy him.

When Tanya flees for help, Deputy Sheriff Andy Simpson pulls over. Charles attacks Simpson and kills him. When Charles then turns to resume feeding off of Tanya, the deputy’s cat, Clovis, attacks him and violently scratches him in the face and chest which mortally wounds him. Knowing that the only way for her dying son to survive is to feed, Mary attacks the Robertson household, killing several deputies and state troopers and severely wounding Tanya’s parents. She kidnaps Tanya and takes her back to her house. Charles is near death, but Mary revives him, and Charles makes a final attempt to drain Tanya’s life force. However, Tanya plunges her fingers into his eyes, killing him. Tanya manages to escape with the help of the sheriff who is later impaled by Mary on the picket fence surrounding the house. The now large number of cats that have been gathering around their house throughout the movie, led by Clovis, all jump on Mary and claw her in a violent attack until she bursts into flames. As she dies, she screams that Tanya "killed her only son". Tanya is last seen holding Clovis while the other cats depart.

=== Characterization ===
In an interview, Amick discussed how her role as Tanya was different from her more victimized roles of the time, stating, "I don't just lay back and take it. I do something; I take action."

== Reception ==
In Stephen King on the Big Screen, Mark Browning criticized the character for being a "damsel in distress" stating that "Tanya in Sleepwalkers survives but spends that film within the confines of stereotype as a screaming, wide-eyed, passive victim. She does nothing to save herself and only survives because of the sacrifice of several cops, parents and many cats - in short, everyone except her." While in Cinefantastique, Volume 23, Frederick S. Clarke gave a much more positive review saying, "In the mode of the nouveau horror heroine, Tanya proves a tenacious fighter as well as a terrific screamer." In both Science Fiction Film Directors, 1895-1998 by Dennis Fischer and The Werewolf Filmography: 300+ Movies by Bryan Senn, Tanya is described as a "virginal heroine" which is an archetypical aspect of the final girl trope. In Loving Vampires: Our Undead Obsession, Tom Pollard compared Tanya to Buffy Summers from the Buffy the Vampire Slayer franchise stating that "Tanya's strength and her vampire-slaying abilities place her in close proximity to Buffy, essentially qualifying her a feminist." In The Complete Stephen King Universe: A Guide to the Worlds of Stephen King, Stanley Wiater, Christopher Golden, and Hank Wagner note that "Tanya employs all her youthful resources to combat the two supernatural creatures." and states that "In Sleepwalkers, women play the pivotal roles of both heroine and main villain. With the exception of Charles, all the other men presented herein are either arrogant fools or inherently weak. The most developed and vital figures are clearly Tanya and Mary."
