= Kansas City Shuffle =

Confidence game and Instrumental music by Bennie Moten

A "Kansas City Shuffle" is an advanced form of a bait-and-switch confidence game employing misdirection, deception, and playing on the mark's arrogance or self-loathing. It is also the title of a 1926 jazz song named after the scheme.

== The scheme ==
For a confidence game to be a "Kansas City Shuffle", the mark must be aware, or at least suspect, that he is involved in a con but also be wrong about how the con artist plans to deceive him. The con artist will attempt to misdirect the mark in a way that leaves him with the impression that he has figured out the game and has the knowledge necessary to outsmart the con artist. Still, by attempting to retaliate, the mark unwittingly performs an action that helps the con artist to further the scheme.

== In song ==
A song with the title was recorded by the "Bennie Moten's Kansas City Orchestra" jazz band on December 13, 1926, in Chicago, Illinois, and originally released by Victor Records on Victor 20406, the flip side being "Harmony Blues" by the same band.

It is one of the first songs called a "shuffle" using the distinctive triplet-driven beat.

The recording is an instrumental. The tune structure is similar to the standard I Wish I Could Shimmy Like My Sister Kate. After a short piano introduction, the band plays two ensemble choruses with breaks by trumpeter Lammar Wright, Sr. This is followed by solos by banjo and saxophone, a stop-time chorus featuring unison work by the reeds, a trombone solo, and finally, our chorus ensemble.

== In media ==
A Kansas City Shuffle was introduced by Mr. Goodkat/Smith (Bruce Willis) in the 2006 film Lucky Number Slevin in the bus terminal scene, where he explained that a Kansas City Shuffle is where "They look right... ...and you... go left." In the movie, the targets are manipulated into hiring their own killers, one of whom they believe to be a patsy. In relation specifically to being labeled as a misdirection con, the film represents the earliest known reference to the term "Kansas City Shuffle".

An equivalent trick is discussed in the 1925 novel John Macnab. "Meaning that you feint in one place, so that your opponent believes it to be a feint and pays no attention—and then you sail in and get to work in that very place." However, the specific term "Kansas City Shuffle" was not used in the novel.
