= Mädchen Amick =

American actress (born 1970)

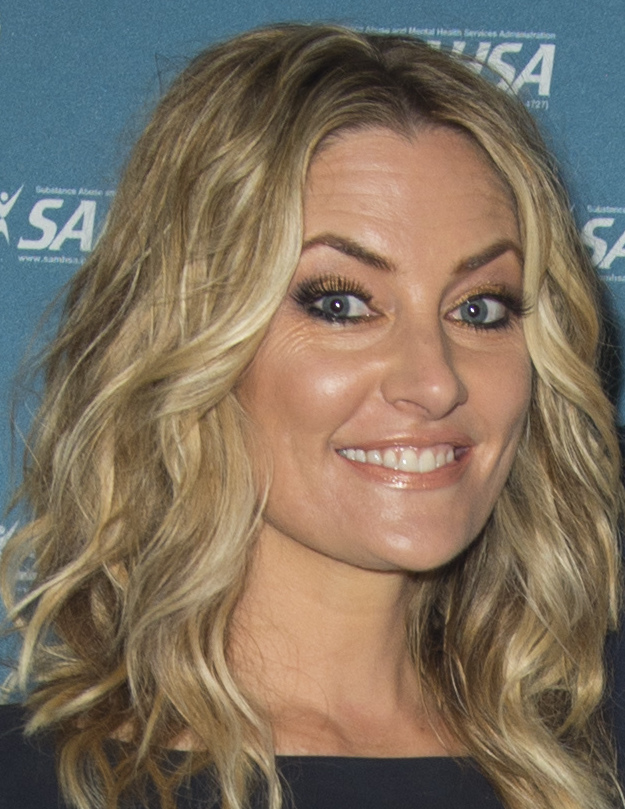
- Amick at the 2016 SAMHSA Voice Awards
- Born: December 12, 1970 (age 55); Sparks, Nevada, U.S.
- Occupations: Actress; director; writer
- Years active: 1988–present
- Known for: Twin Peaks; Riverdale; Sleepwalkers
- Spouse: David Alexis (m. 1995)
- Children: 2

Mädchen Amick (/ˈmeɪtʃən ˈeɪmɪk/ MAY-chən AY-mik; born December 12, 1970) is an American actress and television director. She is known for her starring role as Shelly Johnson on the television series Twin Peaks (1990–1991), its prequel film Twin Peaks: Fire Walk with Me (1992) and its revival television series Twin Peaks: The Return (2017). She appeared in the pilot episode of Baywatch (1989). She was a series regular on Central Park West (1995–1996), Freddie (2005–2006), Christopher's love interest on Gilmore Girls (2000-2001), and Witches of East End (2013–2014) and as Wendall Meade in ER (2004). In film, she had starring roles in Sleepwalkers (1992) and Dream Lover (1993) the latter of which earned a nomination for the Saturn Award for Best Actress. She also portrayed Alice Cooper on The CW's drama television series Riverdale (2017–2023).

Amick is a member of SAG-AFTRA's 2025–2027 National Board.

== Early life ==
Mädchen Elaina Amick was born in Sparks, Nevada, a city that borders Reno, the daughter of Judy (née Ross), a medical office manager, and Bill Amick, a musician. Amick's parents are of partial German descent; they wanted to give her an unusual name and so chose Mädchen (German for girl). As a young girl, Amick was encouraged by her parents to follow her creative instincts. She learned to play the piano, bass, violin and guitar and took lessons in tap, ballet, jazz and modern dance.

== Career ==
After moving to Los Angeles, Amick began her career with guest roles on Star Trek: The Next Generation (1989) and Baywatch (1989). Amick got her first break when director David Lynch chose her to play waitress Shelly Johnson on the television series Twin Peaks (1990–1991). Amick's character endured physical abuse at the hands of her criminal husband, Leo, and was one of the most popular characters. Amick went on to work twice more with Lynch—reprising her role as Shelly in the prequel film Twin Peaks: Fire Walk with Me (1992) and in seven episodes of the 2017 Twin Peaks revival series.

In 1990, Amick was cast as Mandy in Don't Tell Her It's Me and portrayed Amy in Tobe Hooper's horror film I'm Dangerous Tonight. In 1991, Amick was cast in The Borrower. In 1992, Amick portrayed the heroine Tanya Robertson in the Stephen King horror film Sleepwalkers. The following year, she starred in the thriller film Love, Cheat & Steal (1993).

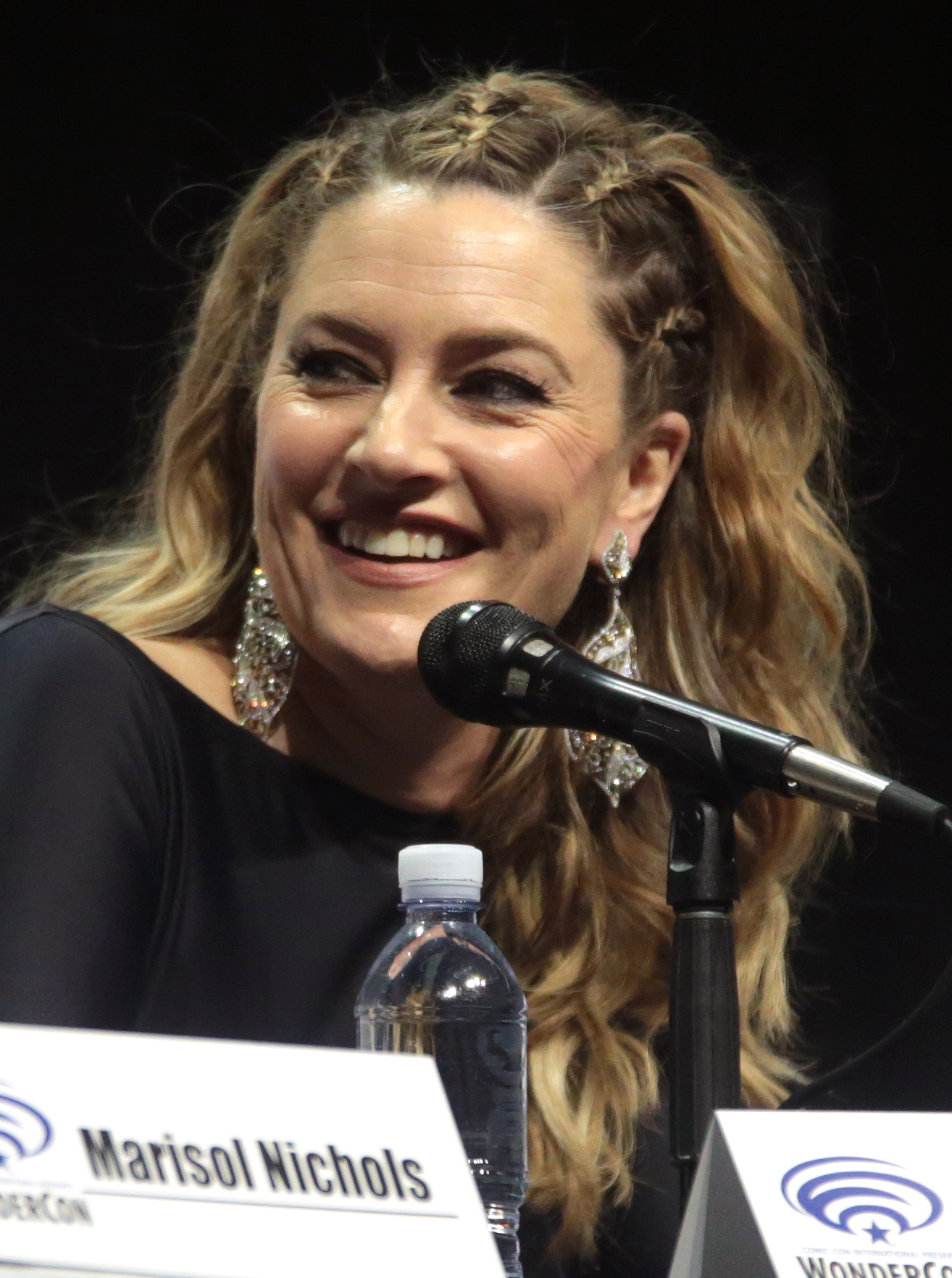
Amick at the 2017 WonderCon

In 1993, Amick was cast as Lena Mathers in the feature film Dream Lover, a thriller in which she co-starred with James Spader. In 1995, she and Spader were reunited in the TV movie The Courtyard. That same year, Amick appeared in the romantic comedy French Exit. In 1996, Amick was cast in the science fiction thriller Bombshell. Amick's return to network television came in the fall of 1995 with the much-publicized CBS primetime soap opera Central Park West. In 1997, she appeared in the film Wounded. In 1998, Amick costarred for one season in the reboot of Fantasy Island on ABC alongside Malcolm McDowell.

After a decade of roles that failed to ignite the publicity Twin Peaks had, Amick gradually became a noticeable face in television with recurring roles on Gilmore Girls, ER, Jake in Progress, and Joey. In 2006, Amick was a regular in the sitcom Freddie, which was subsequently canceled.

Amick guest-starred in a number of episodes of the serial thriller Kidnapped on NBC, playing a strange and deadly assassin. She also had a recurring role in the second season of Dawson's Creek as the lead character's substitute film studies teacher. In 2007, she had a lead role in the short-lived CBS musical series Viva Laughlin.

Amick had a recurring role in season 2 of Gossip Girl, and she also appears in the second season of the Showtime series Californication. In 2008, Amick starred as Christian Slater's wife on the NBC series My Own Worst Enemy. In 2010, Amick played Danielle Marchetti on the FX series Damages.

In 2011, she appeared in the post-apocalyptic film Priest. In 2013, Amick began starring in the Lifetime supernatural drama Witches of East End opposite Julia Ormond, Rachel Boston and Jenna Dewan. Amick's character Wendy Beauchamp was originally a guest star, but she became a permanent character after shooting the pilot episode. On August 6, 2015, Amick joined the cast of American Horror Story: Hotel as a mother whose son is ailing. From 2017 to 2023, Amick starred as Alice Cooper, Betty Cooper's mother, on the CW television series Riverdale.

== Personal life ==
Amick married her boyfriend of 8 years, David Alexis, on December 16, 1995. Together they have two children.

== Filmography ==
=== Film ===
Year	Title	Role	Notes
1990	Don't Tell Her It's Me	Mandy	
1991	The Borrower	Megan	
1992	Twin Peaks: Fire Walk with Me	Shelly Johnson	
1992	Sleepwalkers	Tanya Robertson	
1993	Dream Lover	Lena Mathers	Nominated–Saturn Award for Best Actress
1993	Love, Cheat & Steal	Lauren Harrington	
1994	Trapped in Paradise	Sarah Collins	
1995	French Exit	Zina	
1997	Wounded	Julie Clayton	
1997	Bombshell	Angeline	
1998	Twist of Fate	Rachel Dwyer	
2000	The List	Gabrielle Mitchell	
2001	Italian Ties	Jamie	
2001	Scenes of the Crime	Carmen	
2002	Global Effect	Dr. Sera Levitt	
2005	Four Corners of Suburbia	Rachel Samson	
2005	Lies and deception	Jean Brooks	
2011	Priest	Shannon Pace	
2017	Grannie	Assistant	Short film

=== Television ===
Year	Title	Role	Notes
1989	Star Trek: The Next Generation	Young Anya	Episode: "The Dauphin"
1989	Baywatch	Laurie Harris	Episode: "Panic at Malibu Pier"
1990	The Great American Sex Scandal	Miss Doddsworth	Television film
1990	I'm Dangerous Tonight	Amy	Television film
1990–1991	Twin Peaks	Shelly Johnson	26 episodes Nominated–Soap Opera Digest Awards for Outstanding Supporting Actress: Prime Time
1991	For the Very First Time	Rhonda	Television film
1995	The Courtyard	Lauren	Television film
1995	Fallen Angels	Mrs. Cordell	Episode: "Love and Blood"
1995–1996	Central Park West	Carrie Fairchild	21 episodes
1997	Heartless	Ann "Annie" O'Keefe	Television film
1998	The Hunted	Samantha Clark	Television film
1998–1999	Fantasy Island	Ariel	13 episodes
1999	Dawson's Creek	Nicole Kennedy	3 episodes
1999	Mr. Rock 'n' Roll: The Alan Freed Story	Jackie McCoy	Television film
2001	Hangman	Grace Mitchell	Television film
2002	The Rats	Susan Costello	Television film
2002–2003	Gilmore Girls	Sherry Tinsdale	3 episodes
2003	Queens Supreme	Lisa Salinger	Episode: "The House Next Door"
2003	Wild Card	Crystal Stevenson	Episode: "Black Sheep"
2003	Ed	Celeste "CeCe" Royce	Episode: "Home for Christmas"
2004–2005	ER	Wendall Meade	10 episodes
2005	Lies and Deception	Jean Brooks	Television film
2005	Jake in Progress	Kylie	2 episodes
2005	Joey	Sara	5 episodes
2005–2006	Freddie	Allison Moreno	22 episodes
2006	Law & Order	Alissa Goodwyn	Episode: "Home Sweet"
2006–2007	Kidnapped	Yvonne Guttman	3 episodes
2007	Viva Laughlin	Natalie Holden	8 episodes
2008	Shark	Gina Romero	Episode: "One Hit Wonder"
2008	Gossip Girl	Duchess Catherine Beaton	4 episodes
2008	Californication	Janie Jones	5 episodes
2008	My Own Worst Enemy	Angelica "Angie" Spivey	9 episodes
2009	The Law	Liz	Pilot
2010	Pleading Guilty	Brushy	Pilot
2010	Damages	Danielle Marchetti	5 episodes
2010	CSI: NY	Aubrey Hunter	3 episodes
2010	Unanswered Prayers	Ava Andersson	Television film
2011	White Collar	Selena Thomas	Episode: "Veiled Threats"
2011	Metro	Mary McCarthy	Pilot
2012	Psych	Jacqueline Medeiros	Episode: "Indiana Shawn and the Temple of the Kinda Crappy, Rusty Old Dagger"
2012	Beauty & the Beast	Lois Whitworth	Episode: "Basic Instinct"
2012	Ringer	Greer Sheridan	2 episodes
2012	In Plain Sight	Associate Director Susan Campbell	2 episodes
2012	Mad Men	Andrea Rhodes	Episode: "Mystery Date"
2012	Drop Dead Diva	Gina Blunt	2 episodes
2012	Political Animals	Mindy Meyers	Episode: "Lost Boys"
2013–2014	Longmire	Deena	3 episodes
2013–2014	Witches of East End	Wendy Beauchamp	23 episodes
2015	American Horror Story: Hotel	Mrs. Ellison	3 episodes
2016	Second Chance	Joan Solodar	Episode: "May Old Acquaintance Be Forgot"
2016–2017	Love	Mom	3 episodes
2017	Twin Peaks	Shelly Briggs	7 episodes
2017–2023	Riverdale	Alice Susanna Smith Cooper	117 episodes Also director: "Chapter Seventy-Six: Killing Mr. Honey", "Chapter Ninety: The Night Gallery" and "Chapter One-Thirty: The Crucible"
2025	Brilliant Minds	Alicia Ramati	Episode: "The Fire Fighter"; Also director: "The One That Got Away"

=== Music videos ===
Year	Title	Artist	Roles
1988	"My Guitar Wants to Kill Your Mama"	Dweezil Zappa	Baby
1988	"Temptation"	Wet Wet Wet	
1988	"It Would Take a Strong Strong Man"	Rick Astley	Girlfriend
2016	"Freedom"	Mina Tobias	Director
2016	"Kings & Queens"	Mina Tobias	Director
2017	"Spoken"	Sly Alexis	Director
2018	"Another One" (feat. Gabi DeMartino & Kai Lucas)	Mina Tobias	Director
2019	"Shoes"	Mina Tobias	Herself
