= Lucky Number Slevin =

2006 film directed by Paul McGuigan

- Theatrical release poster
- Directed by: Paul McGuigan
- Written by: Jason Smilovic
- Produced by: Chris Roberts; Christopher Eberts; Kia Jam; Andreas Grosch; Anthony Rhulen; Tyler Mitchell; Robert Kravis
- Starring: Josh Hartnett; Morgan Freeman; Ben Kingsley; Lucy Liu; Stanley Tucci; Bruce Willis
- Cinematography: Peter Sova
- Edited by: Andrew Hulme
- Music by: J. Ralph
- Production companies: The Weinstein Company; Ascendant Pictures; FilmEngine; Capitol Films; Don Carmody Productions; VIP 4 Medienfonds
- Distributed by: MGM Distribution Co.(United States); Alliance Atlantis (Canada); Constantin Filmverleih (Germany); Entertainment Film Distributors (United Kingdom); Capitol Films (Overseas)
- Release dates: February 24, 2006 (United States); April 7, 2006 (United Kingdom)
- Running time: 110 minutes
- Countries: Canada; Germany; United Kingdom; United States
- Language: English
- Budget: $27 million
- Box office: $56.3 million

Lucky Number Slevin (also known as The Wrong Man in Australia) is a 2006 black comedy neo-noir crime thriller film directed by Paul McGuigan and written by Jason Smilovic. The film stars Josh Hartnett, Lucy Liu, Bruce Willis, Stanley Tucci, Ben Kingsley, and Morgan Freeman. Lucky Number Slevin was released in the United Kingdom on April 7, 2006, by Entertainment Film Distributors, and in the United States on February 24, 2006, by MGM Distribution Co.

== Plot ==
Two bookies are separately ambushed and murdered. In a bus terminal, a young man is approached by Goodkat, who tells the story of Max: two decades earlier, Max borrowed money from the Mob to bet on a fixed horse race after eavesdropping on conversations between mobsters, only for the horse to collapse and die just short of the finish line. To set an example to make sure nobody else will try to bet on a fixed race, the Mob killed Max, his wife, and his son Henry. Goodkat then describes the "Kansas City Shuffle", a misleading double bluff, and kills the young man, taking the body in a truck.

In New York City, Slevin Kelevra is staying in his friend Nick Fisher's apartment and, upon being visited by neighbor Lindsey, discusses Nick's disappearance and why the apartment was unlocked. Lindsey suggests that Nick might be missing. After she leaves, Slevin is kidnapped by two henchmen who, mistaking Slevin for Nick, take him to "The Boss". The Boss orders him to repay a gambling debt or kill the son of his rival, "The Rabbi". Believing The Rabbi is responsible for assassinating his son (seen in the intro), The Boss wants The Rabbi's gay son, Yitzchok "The Fairy", to be killed in revenge. Slevin returns to the apartment but is kidnapped again, this time by two of The Rabbi's Jewish henchmen. The Rabbi also mistakes Slevin for Nick and also demands he repay a gambling debt. Slevin tells The Boss he will kill Yitzchok. Meanwhile, it becomes apparent that Goodkat is involved with both sides, that he is responsible for Nick's debts being called in, and that he plans to kill Slevin after Yitzchok dies and make it look like they both committed suicide.

Slevin is approached by Detective Brikowski, who is investigating The Boss and The Rabbi. Brikowski has also been informed that Goodkat is back in town for the first time in twenty years and thinks there is a connection between The Boss, The Rabbi, Goodkat, and Slevin. After pretending to be gay, Slevin gets invited to Yitzchok's apartment, where he kills Yitzchok, and Goodkat (revealed to be working with Slevin) kills the bodyguards. They use the man Goodkat killed in the airport (revealed to be Fisher) in Slevin's place. The two then kidnap The Boss and The Rabbi, whom they restrain in The Boss's penthouse. There, Slevin reveals he is Henry, Max's son. The mobsters who killed Max were The Boss and The Rabbi. Goodkat was the assassin hired to kill young Henry. After an attack of conscience, Goodkat raised Henry as his own. They planted Slevin as Nick (the man in the bus terminal) to get him close to them; Goodkat killed the bookies while Slevin killed The Boss' son. Slevin suffocates The Rabbi and The Boss by taping plastic bags over their heads, killing them the same way they killed his father. Since Lindsey photographed Goodkat while investigating Nick's disappearance, Goodkat shoots her to protect his identity.

While hunting for Slevin, Brikowski gets a phone call from his boss and learns the meaning of the pseudonym Slevin Kelevra: "Lucky Number Slevin" was the horse Max had bet on, and "Kelevra" is Hebrew for bad dog, mirroring Goodkat's name. Brikowski murdered Slevin's mother to pay his own gambling debts twenty years ago. As he hears this story, Brikowski resigns himself to his fate as Slevin appears in his back seat and shoots him dead.

Later, at the bus terminal, Slevin is met by Lindsey. Goodkat previously informed Slevin that he had to murder Lindsey. However, Slevin, who's fallen in love with Lindsey, explained his true identity to her and helped fake her death. When Goodkat appears, aware of the deception, Slevin explains he had to save her and did not think Goodkat would understand. Having saved Slevin as a boy, Goodkat states that he understands and agrees to leave Lindsey alone. Goodkat returns Slevin's father's old watch and disappears into the crowd.

== Cast ==
- Josh Hartnett as Slevin Kelevra/Henry
- Bruce Willis as Mr. Goodkat/Smith
- Lucy Liu as Lindsey
- Morgan Freeman as The Boss
- Ben Kingsley as The Rabbi
- Stanley Tucci as Detective Brikowski
- Mykelti Williamson as Sloe
- Danny Aiello as Roth
- Kevin Chamberlin as Marty
- Sam Jaeger as Nick Fisher
- Dorian Missick as Elvis
- Peter Outerbridge as Detective Dumbrowski
- Corey Stoll as Saul
- Michael Rubenfeld as Yitzchok/The Fairy
- Scott Gibson as Max
- Rami Posner as The Mute
- Robert Forster as Murphy
- Jennifer Miller as Kelly

== Release ==
=== Theatrical ===
After the filming was wrapped, The Weinstein Company paid less than $10 million to acquire the rights to distribute the film in the United States and select overseas territories. For its American release on April 7, 2006, it was the first movie from The Weinstein Company to be distributed by Metro-Goldwyn-Mayer as part of a three year distribution deal between Weinstein and MGM. The deal was terminated three months early in late 2008.

=== Home media ===
The film was released on DVD on September 12, 2006, and on Blu-ray November 8, 2008. To date, the film has made $26,877,256 in home video sales, bringing its worldwide total to $83,186,137. This does not include rentals or Blu-ray sales. In addition to Blu-Ray and DVD, this was one of the few films to be released on the failed HD-VMD format.

== Reception ==
=== Box office ===
Lucky Number Slevin opened in 1,984 theaters in North America and grossed $7,031,921, with an average of $3,544 per theater and ranking #5 at the box office. The film earned $22,495,466 domestically and $33,813,415 internationally for $56,308,881, above its $27 million budget. The film was profitable for its US rights owner The Weinstein Company.

=== Critical response ===
On the review aggregator website Rotten Tomatoes, 52% of 153 critics' reviews are positive. The website's consensus reads: "Trying too hard to be clever in a Pulp Fiction kind of way, this film succumbs to a convoluted plot, overly-stylized characters, and dizzying set design." Metacritic, which uses a weighted average, assigned the film a score of 53 out of 100, based on 36 critics, indicating "mixed or average" reviews. Audiences polled by CinemaScore gave the film an average grade of "B+" on an A+ to F scale.

=== Accolades ===
Directors Guild of Canada

- Nominated: Outstanding Sound Editing – Feature Film

Milan International Film Festival

- Won: Best Film (Paul McGuigan)
- Won: Best Actor (Josh Hartnett)

Motion Picture Sound Editors, USA

- Nominated: Best Sound Editing for Music in a Feature Film
- Nominated: Best Sound Editing for Sound Effects and Foley in a Foreign Film

== Censorship ==
In November 2023, amid the recognition of LGBT as an "extremist organization" in Russia, the film was censored on Kinopoisk: the word "fairy" (Russian: голубок) was bleeped out in the trailer. This was pointed out by journalist Damir Kamaletdinov, who shared the video on his own Twitter page. The scene in which Slevin (Josh Hartnett) and Boss (Morgan Freeman) talk about a man nicknamed Fairy—in English slang, this word is used to refer to a gay man pejoratively—was censored. According to representatives of the Kinopoisk platform, the copyright holder of the movie Lucky Number Slevin decided to censor out the word "fairy" from the picture.

== See also ==
- Tarantinoesque film
