= Sal Schillizzi =

American actor

Sal Schillizzi is a retired American businessman who owned and operated All Over Locksmiths in New York City. Schillizzi is best known for his call-in radio show for burglary prevention and various television appearances. These efforts were designed to educate the public in the area of burglary prevention.

== Career ==
Schillizzi learned safecracking in the 1950s when working at the Brooklyn Navy Yard. While there, he heard of a course on safecracking being taught in Rochester and decided to try it. Schillizzi held the world champion safecracker title for 22 years.

In 1982, he opened Thomas Edison's safe, which had been housed in the Edison National Historic Site, unopened, for at least 27 years. In 1976, he opened a safe, made in the mid-19th century, that had been shut since 1903 in a bank in Somers, New York.

Schillizzi also appeared in two films; Waitress! (1982) and Three Days of the Condor (1975).

== See also ==
- Milton A. Dalton
- Alfred Charles Hobbs
