= Six Days of the Condor =

Novel by James Grady

- First edition
- Author: James Grady
- Language: English
- Series: The Condor series
- Genre: Thriller
- Publisher: W. W. Norton & Company
- Publication date: 1974
- Pages: 192 pp.
- ISBN: 0393086925
- OCLC: 797885
- Dewey Decimal: 813/.5/4
- LC Class: PZ4.G732 Si PS3557.R122
- Followed by: Shadow of the Condor

Six Days of the Condor is a thriller novel by American author James Grady, first published in 1974 by W.W. Norton. A suspense drama set in Washington, D.C., the plot was considerably revised for the 1975 film adaptation Three Days of the Condor.

== Plot ==
Ronald Malcolm is a CIA employee who works in a clandestine operations office in Washington, D.C. responsible for analyzing the plots of mystery and spy novels. One day, when he should be in the office, Malcolm slips out a basement entrance for lunch. In his absence a group of armed men gain entrance to the office and kill everyone there. Malcolm returns, realizes he is in grave danger, and telephones a phone number at CIA headquarters he has been given for emergencies.

When he phones in (and remembers to give his code name "Condor"), he is told to meet an agent named Weatherby who will "bring him in" for protection. However, Weatherby is part of a rogue group within the CIA, the same group responsible for the original assassinations. Weatherby tries to kill Malcolm, who manages to escape. On the run, Malcolm uses his wits to elude both the rogue CIA group and the proper CIA authorities, both of which have a vested interest in his capture or death.

Seeking shelter, Malcolm kidnaps a paralegal named Wendy Ross whom he overhears saying she will spend her coming vacation days holed up in her apartment. Knowing no one will notice her absence, Malcolm enlists her aid in finding out more about the forces after him. She is shot and seriously wounded in the process, but survives.

It is then revealed that the rogue group was using the section where Malcolm works to import illegal drugs from Laos. A supervisor stumbled onto a discrepancy in the records exposing this operation, thus necessitating the section's elimination.

== Sequels ==
Grady followed the novel with Shadow of the Condor in 1976, resuming the series in 2015 with the short story "Next Day of the Condor" and the novel Last Days of the Condor.

== Adaptations ==
Sydney Pollack directed the 1975 film Three Days of the Condor, adapted by David Rayfiel and Lorenzo Semple from Grady's novel.

Both the novel and the film were blended for the television adaptation Condor, first aired in 2018 on the Audience network, with Max Irons in the role of Condor/Joe Turner.
