= My Own Worst Enemy (TV series) =

2008 American drama TV series

- Promotional image
- Genre: Drama; Spy thriller
- Created by: Jason Smilovic
- Starring: Christian Slater; Mädchen Amick; Taylor Lautner; Bella Thorne; Saffron Burrows; Mike O'Malley; Alfre Woodard; James Cromwell
- Country of origin: United States
- Original language: English
- No. of seasons: 1
- No. of episodes: 9

Production
- Executive producer: Jason Smilovic
- Running time: 40 minutes
- Production companies: Dark & Stormy; Universal Media Studios

Original release
- Network: NBC
- Release: October 13 – December 15, 2008

My Own Worst Enemy is an American drama television series that aired on NBC from October 13, 2008, and ended on December 15, 2008, after 9 episodes, with its cancellation announcement after the fourth episode.

== Overview ==
The series was produced by Universal Media Studios. Jason Smilovic was the executive producer; David Semel was the director and executive producer. The final episode ended with a cliff-hanger, and the major plot lines ended without resolution.

The series followed the life of American secret agent Edward Albright and his cover, Henry Spivey, who had no knowledge of his double life. Albright, played by Christian Slater, was implanted with a chip allowing his handlers to physically switch Albright's personality to that of his cover. However, in the pilot episode, there was a malfunction which caused Albright's personalities to switch at random, revealing his secret life to his alias. Henry was then thrown into the highly dangerous life of Edward, with no real way for the two to communicate except through short cell phone video messages.

General Motors was a promotional sponsor of the show, and the then-new SUV model Chevrolet Traverse, along with the 2010 Chevrolet Camaro, appeared as cars for the program's characters via a product placement agreement.

== Characters ==
- Henry Spivey/Edward Albright (Both played by Christian Slater) – Henry is a middle-class efficiency expert living a humdrum life in the suburbs with a wife, two kids, and a dog. Edward is an operative who speaks 13 languages, runs a four-minute mile, and is trained to kill. Henry and Edward are polar opposites who share only one thing in common—the same body. When the carefully constructed wall between them breaks down, Henry and Edward are thrust into unfamiliar territory where each man is dangerously out of his element. The first names match those of the two dueling spirits that shared a body in Robert Louis Stevenson's novella Strange Case of Dr Jekyll and Mr Hyde.
- Angie Spivey (played by Mädchen Amick) – A housewife who lives with her loving husband Henry Spivey and two children, Jack Spivey and Ruthy Spivey.
- Ruthy Spivey (played by Bella Thorne) – Daughter and younger child of Henry and Angie Spivey.
- Jack Spivey (played by Taylor Lautner) – Son and older child of Henry and Angie Spivey.
- Mavis Heller (played by Alfre Woodard) – Edward's supervisor in the superspy organization.
- Tom Grady/Raymond Carter (played by Mike O'Malley) – Raymond Carter is a superspy partner with Edward Albright. Tom Grady is Henry Spivey's friend.
- Dr. Norah Skinner (played by Saffron Burrows) – Dr. Skinner is the company therapist who helps the employees. At the end of the third episode, it is discovered that she knows about Henry/Edward's secret and is currently carrying on an affair with Edward.
- Alistair Trumbull (played by James Cromwell) – Trumbull is the chief of operations for Project Janus. He is both cunning and devious, and he places very little faith in Edward's capabilities as he suspects he has broken.

== Reception ==
The first online review of the series said the show was a "snappily written, fast-paced thriller that shows Slater can be a likable TV star." Another critic described the show as follows: "The real fun comes from watching Slater’s sly performance. Blending elements of Memento‘s "Who the hell am I?" amnesia theme with the middle-class spy humor of Mr. & Mrs. Smith, the actor presents a relatively subtle take on sexy killer Edward Albright, the agent who speaks 13 languages, drives a fast car and lives in a spartan loft stuffed with high-tech weaponry." Metacritic gave the show a score of 61/100 based on 25 critic reviews.

== Episodes ==
No.	Title	Directed by	Written by	Original release date	U.S. viewers (millions)
1	"Breakdown"	David Semel	Jason Smilovic	October 13, 2008	7.3
Henry discovers his alter ego and tries to cope with his discovery, not knowing whether or not he should trust Mavis. Conflicts are resolved and the episode ends with Edward watching a thank you video from Henry. It is established that while the two can't meet, they can communicate.
2	"The Hummingbird"	Félix Enríquez Alcalá	Jason Smilovic	October 20, 2008	5.7
Edward and Raymond must kidnap a German software engineer with information about a possible terrorist attack. Henry tries to deal with the fact that all his childhood memories were made up. With the help of Mavis, Henry must pretend to be Edward when he accidentally meets Edward's boss, Alistair Trumbull.
3	"Hello, Henry"	Bryan Spicer	Tyler Mitchell	October 27, 2008	5.2
Edward is double crossed when he is in Mexico in search of Russia's new age nuclear bomb. Ruthy is accidentally put into a dangerous situation by Edward, which causes an FBI agent to look into the matter. Tom/Raymond's wife thinks there is more to the business trips he always takes, so she hires a private investigator to check it out for her.
4	"That Is Not My Son"	Fred Keller	Courtney Kemp Agboh & Kim Clements	November 10, 2008	4.3
Henry awakens and finds himself in the midst of gunfire, while Edward was trying to save Raymond. He calls for help giving away his whereabouts and his identity. Mary Grady finds out the truth about Tom. He realised that his son, Jack, has got some of Edwards martial arts potential.
5	"The Night Train to Moscow"	David Semel	Rafe Judkins & Lauren LeFranc	November 17, 2008	3.9
Henry starts to suspect that Angie is a spy planted by Janus, while Edward makes a dangerous deal with a KGB agent in exchange for information regarding his past.
6	"High Crimes and Turducken"	Adam Kane	Mark Rosner	November 24, 2008	3.7
Edward puts national security in jeopardy in finding the culprit who murdered his parents. Angie braces herself in the arrival of her father. Tom gives his marriage a second chance. Henry gets to see first hand Edward's relationship with Dr. Norah Skinner.
7	"Down Rio Way"	Michael Watkins	Rafe Judkins & Daniel Knauf	December 1, 2008	3.9
Edward commits treason, when asking about his parents' death. Raymond tries to reason with Tom and Mary to avoid any potential accidents.
8	"Love In All the Wrong Places"	Gwyneth Horder-Payton	Scott Murphy	December 8, 2008	3.6
While on a mission in Angola, Edward and Raymond find long time American hostages. Mavis and Alistair Trumbull can't agree on exactly how they want to go about bringing them home.
9	"Henry and the Terrible, Horrible No Good Very Bad Day"	David Straiton	Rafe Judkins & Lauren LeFranc & Tyler Mitchell	December 15, 2008	3.9
Edward thinks he may have found a reliable, yet dangerous way to activate the switch between himself and Henry.

== DVD releases ==
The complete series was released to DVD on April 21, 2009.
