= Love, Cheat & Steal =

1993 television film by William Curran

- Genre: Thriller
- Written by: William Curran
- Directed by: William Curran
- Starring: John Lithgow; Eric Roberts; Mädchen Amick
- Music by: Pray for Rain
- Original language: English

Production
- Producer: Brad Krevoy
- Cinematography: Kent L. Wakeford
- Editor: Carole Kravetz
- Production companies: Motion Picture Corporation of America; Showtime Networks

Original release
- Network: Showtime
- Release: December 5, 1993

Love, Cheat & Steal is a 1993 American made-for-television thriller film written and directed by William Curran and starring John Lithgow, Eric Roberts, and Mädchen Amick.

== Plot ==
After being released from prison, a man infiltrates his ex-wife and her wealthy husband's lives with a vengeance. He plots to rob his ex-wife's husband's bank and expects her to succumb to his evil sexual advances and mind games.

== Cast ==
- John Lithgow as Paul Harrington
- Eric Roberts as Reno Adams
- Mädchen Amick as Lauren Harrington
- Richard Edson as Billy Quayle
- Donald Moffat as Frank Harrington
- David Ackroyd as Tom Kerry
- Dan O'Herlihy as Hamilton Fisk
- Jason Workman as Whit Turner
- Claude Earl Jones as The Mayor
- Bill McKinney as Kolchak
- Jack Axelrod as Mario Columbard
- John Pyper-Ferguson as Collins
- Mary Fanaro as Darlene
- Chuck Zito as Jake
- Danny Trejo as The Cuban
- Peter Lupus as A Guard
- Edward Bunker as Old Con
