= Sleepwalkers (1992 film) =

1992 film by Mick Garris

- Theatrical release poster
- Directed by: Mick Garris
- Written by: Stephen King
- Produced by: Michael Grais; Mark Victor; Dimitri Logothetis; Nabeel Zahid
- Starring: Brian Krause; Mädchen Amick; Alice Krige
- Cinematography: Rodney Charters
- Edited by: Nicholas Brown
- Music by: Nicholas Pike
- Production companies: Ion Pictures; Victor & Grais Productions
- Distributed by: Columbia Pictures
- Release date: April 10, 1992
- Running time: 89 minutes
- Country: United States
- Language: English
- Budget: $15 million
- Box office: $30.5 million

Sleepwalkers (also known as Stephen King's Sleepwalkers) is a 1992 American horror film written by Stephen King and directed by Mick Garris. The film stars Brian Krause, Mädchen Amick and Alice Krige. The film revolves around Charles and Mary Brady, the last two survivors of a vampiric feline shapeshifting species that feed on the life force of human female virgins. It was the first time King wrote a screenplay intended for the screen first, rather than adapting one of his novels or stories.

== Plot ==
Charles Brady and his mother/lover Mary are sleepwalkers, nomadic shapeshifting energy vampires who feed off the lifeforce of virgin women. Though they normally maintain a human form, they can transform into human-sized bipedal werecats, their natural form, at will. They have powers of both telekinesis and illusion. Domestic cats are their only weakness and the two species are mutually hostile. Cats see through their illusions and violently attack them, inflicting severe to fatal wounds on them with their claws and teeth.

Charles and Mary live in Travis, a small Indiana town, having recently fled Bodega Bay, California, after draining and killing a young girl there. Charles attends the local high school, and meets Tanya Robertson in his creative writing class. Many of the girls at the school fancy Charles. Charles feigns romantic interest in Tanya in order to take her lifeforce for himself and his starving mother. Their teacher, Mr. Fallows, is suspicious about Charles and tells him he knows that his older high school certificates and transcripts were fakes; he also attempts to sexually assault Charles as blackmail but Charles kills and devours him.

On their first date, at a picnic at a nearby cemetery, Charles attempts to drain Tanya's lifeforce while kissing her. Tanya tries frantically to ward off Charles by bashing his head with her camera, scratching his face and plunging a corkscrew into his left eye, though nothing she does seems to cause Charles more than temporary discomfort and annoyance.

Deputy Sheriff Andy Simpson is driving by the cemetery. When Tanya flees to him for help, Charles kills Simpson. When Charles resumes feeding off Tanya, the deputy's cat Clovis, enraged by his master's death, violently scratches him in the face and chest. Mortally wounded, Charles staggers back home to Mary, who is able to make both of them "dim" (almost invisible) and thus keep Charles from being arrested when the police storm their house. Clovis and a small number of other cats begin to gather outside, only kept at bay by the leghold traps the Sleepwalkers have set.

Knowing that the only way for her dying son to survive is to feed, Mary attacks the Robertson household, killing several deputies and state troopers and severely wounding Tanya's parents Donald and Helen. She kidnaps Tanya and takes her back to her house. Charles is near death but Mary revives him, and Charles makes a final attempt to drain Tanya's life force. However, Tanya plunges her fingers into his eyes, finally killing him. Tanya escapes with the help of Sheriff Ira Stevens, whom Mary later impales on the picket fence surrounding the house. The cats that have been gathering around their house, led by Clovis, jump on Mary and claw and bite her until she bursts into flames and dies. Mary with her final dying breath, cries out that Tanya has killed her only son. Tanya hugs Clovis, her savior, as the other cats depart, leaving Mary's body lying ablaze on her former driveway.

== Cast ==
- Brian Krause as Charles Brady
- Alice Krige as Mary Brady
- Mädchen Amick as Tanya Robertson
- Lyman Ward as Donald Robertson
- Cindy Pickett as Helen Robertson
- Ron Perlman as Captain Soames
- Jim Haynie as Sheriff Ira Stevens
- Dan Martin as Deputy Andy Simpson
- Lucy Boryer as Jeanette
- Glenn Shadix as Mr. Fallows
- Sparks as Clovis
- Stephen King as Cemetery Caretaker
- John Landis as Lab Technician
- Joe Dante as Lab Assistant
- Clive Barker as Forensic Tech
- Tobe Hooper as Forensic Tech
- Mark Hamill as Sheriff Jenkins (uncredited)

== Production ==
Sleepwalkers was the first film written by Stephen King to not be based on one of his preexisting works. Columbia Pictures initially approached Rupert Wainwright to direct but at King's insistence Columbia offered the film to Mick Garris, who had previously directed the horror films Critters 2: The Main Course and Psycho IV: The Beginning. Garris eagerly accepted the position as he had wanted to work with King on a movie for awhile. Garris theorized that his work on Psycho IV: The Beginning may have led to his hiring as like Sleepwalkers that film had a heavy focus on the mother-son relationship.

The film was shot in Franklin Canyon Park in Los Angeles, California. Garris said there were a couple of ideas he put into the film that hadn't been in King's original script. One is the introduction and title sequence from a page in the Book of Arcane Knowledge (which he invented) to give it a little backstory. The other was the scene where the Sleepwalkers Charles (Brian Krause) and Mary Brady (Alice Krige) are making love.

=== Cameos ===
Garris had initially planned to include cameos from other directors who had made Stephen King adaptations but schedule conflicts and a lack of connection to Garris meant they didn't happen. John Carpenter had been offered a cameo but at the time was busy filming Memoirs of an Invisible Man. George A. Romero had initially been planning to film a cameo but this was cancelled as Romero was sick at the time. Instead, Garris filled out the planned cameos with friends and colleagues with whom he had worked, such as Tobe Hooper and Clive Barker.

=== Post production ===
As a result of the film's violence and sexuality, Sleepwalkers had to be submitted five times before the MPAA would award an R-rating. Among the sequences truncated include Mary Brady biting off Captain Soames (Ron Perlman)'s fingers with the chewing still in the final film but not her spitting them out or showing them hitting the floor. Another violent sequence that was heavily altered was the sequence where Tanya Robertson (Mädchen Amick) stabs a corkscrew into Charles Brady's eye with the sequence of the eye and its connective tissue being pulled significantly cut. Additionally, Garris said a sex scene was so explicit he had to cut it to avoid an X-rating by the Motion Picture Association.

== Soundtrack ==
The original music score was composed by Nicholas Pike.

CD track listing
Track	Artist	Title	Time
1	Santo & Johnny	"Sleep Walk"	2:23
2	Nicholas Pike	"Main Titles"	2:06
3	Nicholas Pike	"Cop Kabob"	2:25
4	Nicholas Pike	"This Is Homeland"	4:06
5	Nicholas Pike	"Is This What You Had in Mind?"	2:49
6	Nicholas Pike	"Let's Go Upstairs"	2:46
7	Nicholas Pike	"You Didn't Get It"	3:05
8	Nicholas Pike	"Run to That Jungle Beat"	2:24
9	The Contours	"Do You Love Me"	3:00
10	Nicholas Pike	"Am I Beautiful?"	1:31
11	Nicholas Pike	"Let the Cats Run"	4:31
12	Nicholas Pike	"I'm Going to Make Us Dim"	2:36
13	Nicholas Pike	"Fly on the Chicken"	2:57
14	Nicholas Pike	"Impaling Doom"	3:44
15	Nicholas Pike	"Speedster"	3:39
16	Enya	"Boadicea"	3:30

(Side 2 of the cassette begins at track 9)

== Reception ==
On review aggregator Rotten Tomatoes, the film has an approval rating of 32% based on 19 reviews. On Metacritic the film has a score of 38% based on reviews from 12 critics, indicating "generally unfavorable reviews". Audiences polled by CinemaScore gave the film an average grade of "C+" on an A+ to F scale.

Variety called it "an idiotic horror potboiler". British horror critic Alan Jones gave the film a scathing review in the Radio Times, saying that "Garris tries to inject life into the pathetic script... but this underdeveloped material is so poor he's constantly fighting a losing battle. There's little to engage the attention in an idiotic potboiler off the creaky King conveyor belt. From the daft prologue set in Bodega Bay where Hitchcock filmed The Birds to the soggy moggy climax, this is absurdly unscary and confusingly dull." In Horror Films FAQ: All That's Left to Know About Slashers, Vampires, Zombies, Aliens, and More, John Kenneth Muir praised the first half of the film, stating: "Sleepwalkers starts out in fine form, as a serious, grim, involving horror film about the last two survivors of a species doing what they must to survive, Krige is incredibly sensual as the half-crazed mother who must be 'fed' through the act of sexual intercourse with her son." He then says that the latter half of the film "devolves into a campy disaster."

== Proposed sequel ==
In April 2020, on his Post Mortem podcast during a listener Q&A session with producer of his podcast Joe Russo, Garris confirmed that there was discussion from Columbia Pictures about a sequel, saying in full, "There was a little bit of talk. I mean, the movie was successful, it was the #1 movie the week that it came out. I never heard the studio talk about it, but Tabitha King, Stephen King's wife, actually wrote a treatment for a sequel to Sleepwalkers that involved a women's basketball team somehow. I'm not sure how, I never read it, but King was very excited that Tabby came up with this. But it was a sequel that nobody at the studio gave a shit about. You know, they liked the money that Sleepwalkers made, but it was not a prestige release by any means, so they never even thought about Sleepwalkers after." Both Garris and Russo then discussed a potential reboot, with Garris expressing surprise that there was seemingly no interest, with Russo admitting that "We had a very flirtatious conversation with a production company about a year ago, maybe. It was nothing more than flirting."

== See also ==
- Vampire film
