= Dream Lover (1993 film) =

1993 film by Nicholas Kazan

- Theatrical release poster
- Directed by: Nicholas Kazan
- Written by: Nicholas Kazan
- Produced by: Sigurjón Sighvatsson; Wallis Nicita; Lauren Lloyd
- Starring: James Spader; Mädchen Amick; Bess Armstrong; Frederic Lehne; Larry Miller
- Cinematography: Jean-Yves Escoffier
- Edited by: Susan Crutcher; Jill Savitt
- Music by: Christopher Young
- Production companies: PolyGram Filmed Entertainment; Propaganda Films; Nicita/Lloyd Productions; Edward R. Pressman Productions
- Distributed by: Gramercy Pictures
- Release dates: October 1993 (MIFED (Mercato internazionale del film e del documentario)); May 6, 1994 (United States)
- Running time: 103 minutes
- Country: United States
- Language: English
- Budget: $15 million
- Box office: $256,264

Dream Lover is a 1993 American erotic thriller film written and directed by Nicholas Kazan and starring James Spader and Mädchen Amick, with Bess Armstrong, Frederic Lehne, and Larry Miller in supporting roles. The original music score was composed by Christopher Young.

== Plot ==
Ray Reardon, a successful architect in Los Angeles, divorces his wife, and goes to a gallery opening to meet a blind date set up by his friend, Norman. While there, he bumps into an attractive young woman, making her spill wine on herself, and she verbally abuses him. A week later, Ray runs into the woman, Lena Mathers, at a supermarket. She apologizes for her behavior and the two go to dinner. They have sex the next night, marry shortly thereafter, and become parents.

Despite his happiness in the marriage and with his two children, Ray becomes suspicious after catching Lena in several lies about her past. An assistant for one of his clients went to Swarthmore College one year before Lena supposedly attended the same school. The assistant remembers the university president, Sam Shaw, dying of a heart attack while giving a university-wide talk; when Ray mentions the name "Sam Shaw" (but not his profession or heart attack) to Lena, Lena talks about Shaw as if he was a fellow student, clearly not knowing who Shaw was or having any recollection of the university president's death. A woman meets the couple at a restaurant and recognizes Lena as "Sissy" from Piru, Texas, but Lena says the woman has confused her for somebody else. Ray also finds out that Lena's "friends" who attended their wedding were temp agency workers hired by Lena.

A few years later, Ray visits Piru and is told by a town resident, Buddy, that a picture of Lena shown by Ray is "Sissy," a nickname for Thelma. Ray visits the family home and meets Lena's parents, Mr. and Mrs. Sneeder, who recognize Ray and know his name. Ray finds out that alleged beatings of Lena as a child by her mother did not happen, and that Lena told her parents Ray was an employee of the Central Intelligence Agency. Ray arranges for Lena's parents to visit and stay with them, which makes Lena clearly uncomfortable. After her parents' departure, Lena admits to Ray that she changed her identity from Thelma "Sissy" Sneeder to Lena Mathers and invented a new life story for herself because she wanted to escape from her town to avoid a life of poverty and likely marriage to Buddy. Lena also tells Ray she was in love with him from afar before they met, and that she deliberately engineered their supposedly accidental meeting.

Despite being unnerved by these revelations, Ray is still in love with his wife and attracted to her. However, Ray becomes increasingly paranoid when Lena sports bruises that she will not explain and begins doing things that indicate she is having an affair. During a tense confrontation, Lena taunts Ray by claiming to have had an affair with an unnamed friend of his and telling Ray his children might not be biologically his. Ray hits Lena and storms out of their penthouse apartment. Lena deliberately causes bruises to herself and damage to the home, framing Ray and having him arrested. Lena's psychiatrist, Dr. Stein, has Ray committed to a mental hospital for observation.

During a hearing to ascertain Ray's sanity, Dr. Stein reveals Lena had alleged longtime physical abuse by Ray, and that Ray is a danger to Lena; Ray vehemently denies both claims. Ray's friend Norman testifies against Ray, proving Ray's accusation of an affair with Lena are false, even though he admits being attracted to her. When Ray brings up Lena's hotel receipts, indicating an affair on her part, Lena claims her credit card was stolen and somebody else was booking the hotel under her name. Despite Ray's increasingly desperate attempt to prove that Lena has been lying, the judge finds Ray to be mentally incompetent and orders him held for six months. Shortly after being committed, Ray - under heavy sedation - is visited by Lena, who privately admits to him that his suspicions about her were correct and that she had planned this for years to get his money.

Ray devises a plan of revenge. He convinces Elaine – the wife of his friend Larry – to tell Lena that she made "a mistake" in her "master plan". Elaine suspects Lena has been having an affair with Larry, who secretly bought a house in New Zealand without Elaine's knowledge, and which might be an escape plan by Lena.

Lena shows up at the mental institution to talk to Ray. On the hospital grounds outside the building, Ray lures Lena away from the attendants who are supposed to be supervising him, having enlisted a fellow inmate to provide a distraction. Lena, who does not deny Ray's accusation that she is a psychopath, confirms her affair with Larry and says she will dispose of him as she did Ray. Ray compliments Lena on her scheme but tells her that having him declared insane was the "mistake" because he could not now be held legally accountable for killing her. Ray proceeds to strangle Lena to death on the lawn.

== Cast ==
- James Spader as Ray Reardon
- Mädchen Amick as Lena Mathers Reardon / Thelma "Sissy" Sneeder
- Bess Armstrong as Elaine
- Fredric Lehne as Larry
- Larry Miller as Norman
- Kathleen York as Martha
- Blair Tefkin as Cheryl
- Scott Coffey as Billy
- Clyde Kusatsu as Judge Kurita
- William Shockley as Buddy

== Reception ==
Roger Ebert judged Dream Lover a layered and delicate thriller which goes beyond the outer layer of one character maintaining a secret and another trying to discover it, to a game of multiple stages of deception which both the lead characters are to some extent complicit in. He found both Amick and Spader highly effective in their roles, and though he described the ending as disappointing, he concluded, "But the movie's rewards are not really intended for the ending, anyway; it's the sensuous, deadly game of romantic cat-and-mouse that makes 'Dream Lover' worth seeing." He gave the film three stars.

Peter Rainer of the Los Angeles Times gave Dream Lover a positive review, stating, "Although Kazan draws on the femme fatale conventions of film noir, he’s trying to tap a wider range of meanings. At its best, the film plays like a shadow play on the themes of marriage and fidelity--on the limits of really knowing the person you share your life with... It’s a tricky, harrowing little film. Kazan keeps things fairly schematic--every plot point is secured, every look is “knowing”—but the overall effect is ambiguously unsettling." Rainer had some issues with Spader's character, but noted, "Madchen Amick, however, is a real find. In her first full-scale film role, she manages to give Lena’s surface blankness some depth. Lena has a way of looking both vague and fixated. It’s the look of someone who is constantly reinventing herself. Kazan recoils from her but coddles her too. He understands that Lena is too fragrant a monster to squash."

On the review aggregator website Rotten Tomatoes, 57% of 14 critics' reviews are positive, with an average rating of 5.6/10. Metacritic, which uses a weighted average, assigned the film a score of 62 out of 100, based on 15 critics, indicating "generally favorable" reviews.

Years after appearing in Dream Lover, Mädchen Amick stated, "I did a movie with James Spader called Dream Lover, and I really loved that script and that film, and it was a really great experience... Well, actually, probably my favorite scene of that film is the very end scene, which nobody will ever see, because the studio re-shot it and changed the ending. So, it's this mysterious thing that will never be seen." Amick also stated, "The opportunity to play the role of Lena in Dream Lover, acting beside the incredibly talented James Spader, was important in my confidence as an actor. Nicholas Kazan, who wrote and directed, took a leap of faith and believed in me enough to carry the film. It made a huge difference in roles that came my way; especially coming out of the large ensemble cast of Twin Peaks, and "I really enjoyed the journey of filming Dream Lover written and directed by Nicholas Kazan where I starred alongside James Spader. It was my first female lead character and the material was so deep and fun to find on film."

== Different versions ==
At least two different versions of Dream Lover have been officially released; the R-rated theatrical cut, and the slightly longer "unrated" cut. The unrated cut was released on VHS and LaserDisc in the USA; the international VHS release, as well as DVD editions and streaming services, retain the theatrical cut.

The unrated cut, longer by several minutes, contains more explicit sex scenes featuring James Spader and Mädchen Amick and also has an extended ending. After Ray murders Lena, the scene changes to an unspecified time in the future. Released from the mental hospital, Ray and his children are visiting a zoo. When asked by his son what his mother was like, Ray replies she was the most wonderful woman in the world. Ray's daughter asks her father, if he ever chooses to remarry, to promise he will marry somebody just like her mother; Ray kisses her hand in a stony voice and says he promises.

== See also ==
- List of films featuring home invasions
