= Jason Smilovic =

American writer and executive producer (born 1975)

- Born: March 3, 1975 (age 51); New York City, New York, U.S.
- Education: University of Maryland, College Park
- Occupations: Screenwriter, executive producer
- Writing career
- Notable works: Karen Sisco, Kidnapped, Bionic Woman, My Own Worst Enemy

Jason Smilovic is an American writer and executive producer, as well as the creator of the television series Karen Sisco, Kidnapped, My Own Worst Enemy, and Condor. He also wrote the film Lucky Number Slevin. Smilovic graduated from the University of Maryland with a degree in political theory and philosophy. He has worked frequently with director-producer Michael Dinner. His production company is Dark & Stormy Entertainment, which in 2007, signed a deal with Universal.

== Filmography ==
=== Films ===
Year	Title	Notes
2006	Lucky Number Slevin	Writer
2016	War Dogs	Writer

=== Television ===
Year	Title	Notes
2003–2004	Karen Sisco	Developer, writer, co-executive producer
2006–2007	Kidnapped	Creator, writer, executive producer
2007	Bionic Woman	Writer, executive producer
2008	My Own Worst Enemy	Creator, executive producer
2018	Condor	Creator, executive producer

== Personal life ==
Smilovic is Jewish.
