= James Grady (author) =

American writer and investigative journalist (born 1949)

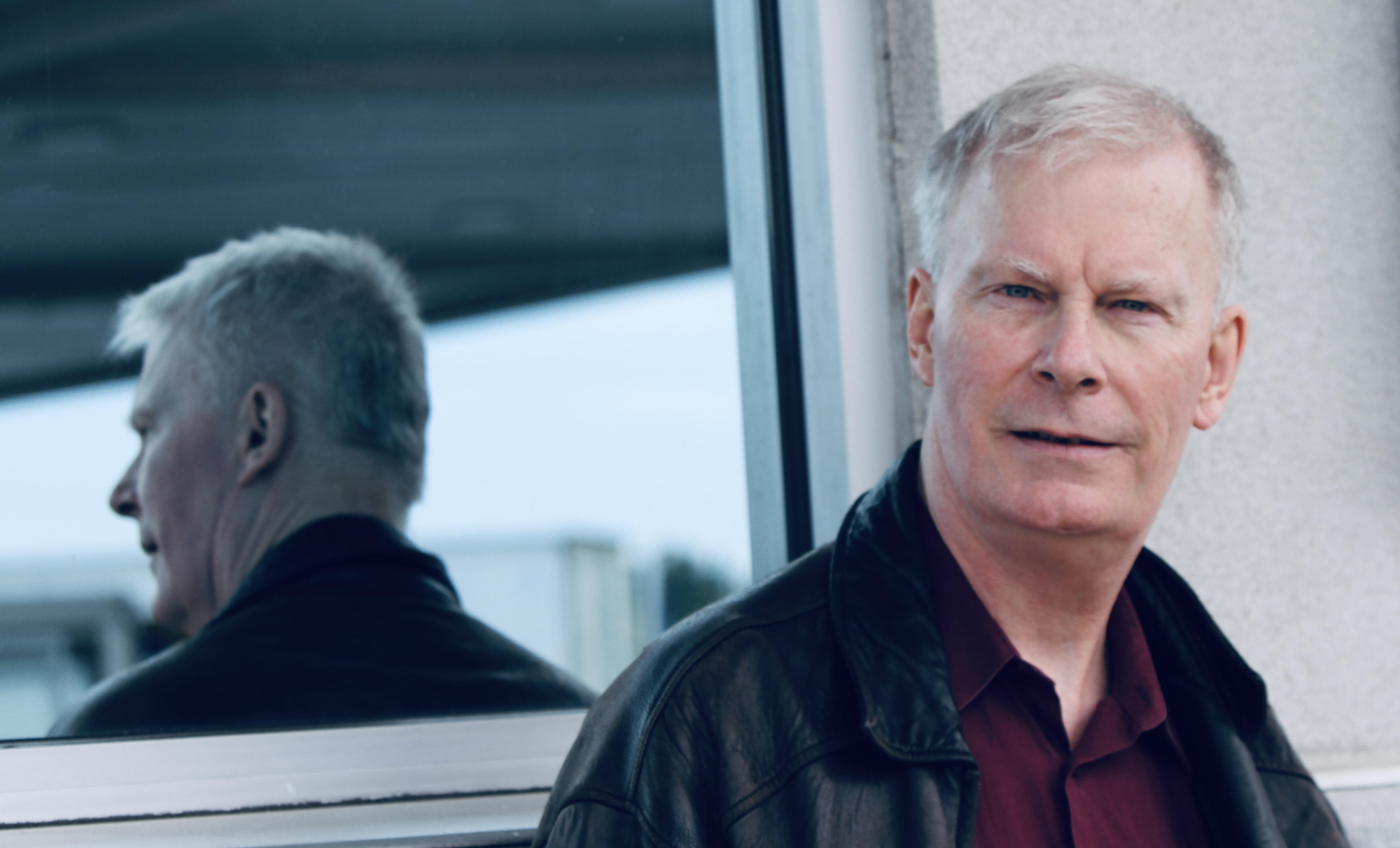
- Born: April 30, 1949 (age 77); Shelby, Montana, U.S.
- Education: Shelby High School (1967) University of Montana (B.A., Journalism, 1972)
- Occupation: Writer
- Spouse: Bonnie Goldstein
- Children: Rachel Grady Academy Award documentary nominee (Jesus Camp); Nathan Grady, short story author
- Writing career
- Pen name: James Dalton, Brit Shelby, Nick Russe
- Genres: Thriller; Muckraking Historical Novels
- Subjects: Espionage, police procedurals
- Notable work: Six Days of the Condor (1974)
- Notable awards: Grand Prix Du Roman Noir, Raymond Chandler Award, Baka-Misu Award Two Regardies Magazine awards for Short Fiction Nominee, Mystery Writers of America Edgar award for short stories

James Grady (born April 30, 1949) is an American writer and investigative journalist known for his thriller novels on espionage, intrigue, and police procedurals, as well as his screenwriting work for TV shows with Stephen J. Cannell and film work with Brandon Lee, William Katt and David Hasselhoff. Grady has edited fiction anthologies, and published numerous short stories and poems. In 2008, London's Daily Telegraph named Grady as one of "50 crime writers to read before you die". In 2015, The Washington Post compared his prose to George Orwell and Bob Dylan.

== Early life ==
Grady’s mother, Donna J. Grady, was part of the Martin family, who settled in northern Montana in 1884. Her father worked as a cowboy and card dealer in the saloons of Shelby, MT. Grady’s father, Thomas W. Grady, came from a family of homesteaders. Until Grady was about 17, his father managed the Roxy movie theater in Shelby. Grady describes a pivotal six-month period during his junior year of high school when his father was unemployed. During that time, his mother took on a job as an Assistant Librarian for Toole County in Shelby, which he credits as a significant influence on his personal development. As a Teenage Republican, Grady was the youngest member of the 1964 Republican Party State Convention’s Platform Committee. His first creative writing success was authoring his high school senior class 1967 play.

Grady graduated from the University Of Montana School of Journalism in 1972, though he technically finished university studies in 1971. He studied with poet Richard Hugo and was a Sears Congressional Journalism Intern from January to April 1971, assigned to the D.C. staff of U.S. Senator Lee Metcalf (D-MT). He was the movie reviewer for the university student newspaper The Kaimin. He received a Distinguished Alumni Award from his alma mater in 2005. Grady lovingly credits his four college summers working on his hometown Shelby, MT's city road, water and sewer crew with both letting him pay his own way through university and increasing the scope and depth of his education.

== Career ==
In 1971, Grady worked as a Research Analyst and committee aide for the Montana Constitutional Convention, which adopted a renewed state Constitution in 1972. He received a Fellowship to spend 1974 on the staff of U.S. Sen. Lee Metcalf (D-MT). From 1975 to mid-1980, during the post-Watergate era, he worked with muckraking investigative journalist Jack Anderson.

Grady is the author of the 1974 espionage thriller novel Six Days of the Condor, which was famously adapted to film as Three Days of the Condor (1975), starring Robert Redford and directed by Sydney Pollack.

Grady has contributed journalism to Slate, The Washington Post, Washingtonian, American Film, The New Republic, Sport, Parade, Perfect 10, The Great Falls (Montana) Tribune, The Shelby (Montana) Promoter, The Daily Missoulian (Montana), PoliticsDaily.com and the Journal of Asian Martial Arts.

He is a member of the Writers Guild of America, East.

== Personal life ==
Grady married Bonnie Goldstein in 1985. He is the stepfather of Rachel Grady, director of the documentary Jesus Camp. He is the father of Nathan Grady.

== Works ==
=== Novels ===
- Six Days of the Condor (1974)
- The Great Pebble Affair (1975) [as Brit Shelby]
- Shadow of the Condor (1976)
- Catch the Wind (1980)
- Runner in the Street (1984)
- Hard Bargains (1985)
- Razor Game (1985)
- Just a Shot Away (1987)
- Steeltown (1989)
- River of Darkness (1991, reissued as The Nature of the Game)
- Thunder (1994)
- White Flame (1996)
- City of Shadows (2000) [as James Dalton]
- Mad Dogs (2006)
- Last Days of the Condor (2015)
- This Train (2022)
- Unusual Suspects (1996) anthology editor
- Montana Noir (2017) anthology co-editor w/Keir Graff

=== Short stories ===
- "The Train" (Regardie's Magazine -- First Place fiction award 1988)
- "The Devil’s Playground" (tribute, Raymond Chandler’s Philip Marlowe –1988)
- "The Arranger" (Regardie's Magazine – 2nd Place fiction award 1991)
- "OMJAGOD" (Murder For Halloween – 1994)
- "The Championship Of Nowhere" (Best American Mystery Stories 2002)
- "Kiss The Sky" (Unusual Suspects – 1996 & D.C. Noir 2: The Classics – 2008. A fundraiser for Share Our Strength) * "condor.net" (Perfect 10 Magazine 2005)
- "Broken Heroes” (Perfect 10 Magazine 2006)
- "The Bottom Line" (D.C. Noir – 2006)
- "What’s Going On: A Political Fiction In Nine Episodes” (Politics.Daily.com – 2009)
- "Border Town" (Son Of Retro Pulp Tales – 2009)
- "The Big Time" (Bad Cop, No Donut – 2010)
- "Dark Stalkings” (The Dark End Of The Street – 2010)
- "Destiny City" – (Best American Mystery Stories 2011)
- "The Mansion Of Imperatives" (Home Improvement Undead Edition 2011)
- "This Given Sky" (Kindle novella about Montana -- Open Roads Media – 2011)
- "Falling Into Forever" (Bethesda Magazine 2011)
- "We’ve Got To Stop" (SOL English Writing In Mexico – 2012)
- "The Ride You’ve Got" (To Hell In A Fast Car 2012)
- "The Fires Of Forever" (Phnom Penh Noir 2012)
- "The Giggler" (The Washington Post – 2013)
- "Hometown Sun" (The Strand Magazine 2013)
- “Thunder Road" (Trouble In The Heartland – Bruce Springsteen tribute – 2014)
- “PAT In Love & War & Soccer" (Explosions – funding Mines Advisory Group -- 2014)
- "You’re Worth It" – as Nick Russell – (Explosions – funding MAG – 2014)
- "Caged Daze Of The Condor" (Red Bulletin – 2014)
- "Next Day Of The Condor" (No Exit Press – 2015)
- "Condor In The Stacks" (The Mysterious Bookshop – 2015)
- "Jasmine Daze Of The Condor" (Playboy – 2017)
- "The Road You Take" (Montana Noir anthology – 2017)
- "Ring Of Fie" (Just To Watch Them Die – Johnny Cash tribute – 2017)
- "Russian Roulette Of The Condor" (Mysterious Press – Open Road – 2019)
- "The Lifeguard" (Invisible Blood 2019)
- "Demolition Derby" (Gargoyle 2021)
- "Condor" (novella, The Mysterious Bookshop – 2023)
- "The Next Five Minutes" (Report From The Deep End, J.G. Ballard homage 2023)
