= Dolby (disambiguation) =

Dolby is Dolby Laboratories, a British-American company founded in 1965.

Dolby may also refer to:

== Technology ==
- Dolby Cinema, a type of premium movie theater created by Dolby Laboratories
- Dolby noise-reduction system, a 1965-on series for analog magnetic tape audio by Dolby Laboratories

== People ==
- David C. Dolby (1946–2010), American soldier
- Edwin Dolby (1838–1900), English architect
- Hugh Dolby (1888–1964), English footballer
- Peter Dolby (1940–2019), English footballer
- Ray Dolby (1933–2013), American engineer
- Thomas Dolby (born 1958), English musician
- Tom Dolby (born 1975), American novelist
- Charlotte Sainton-Dolby (1821–1885), English contralto
- Craig Dolby (born 1988), British racing driver
- Dagmar Dolby (born 1940s), American billionaire
- Richard Dolby (born 1938), metallurgist
- Sandra Stahl Dolby (born 1946), professor of Folklore and Ethnomusicology

== Places ==
- Dolby Theatre, a live-performance auditorium, Hollywood, Los Angeles, California, US
