= Girls Who Like Boys Who Like Boys (book) =

Book by Melissa de la Cruz

- Editors: Melissa de la Cruz; Tom Dolby
- Language: English
- Genre: Anthology
- Publication date: 2007
- Publication place: United States
- Media type: Print (Hardcover)

Girls Who Like Boys Who Like Boys: True Tales of Love, Lust, and Friendship Between Straight Women and Gay Men is a 2007 anthology co-edited by novelists Melissa de la Cruz and Tom Dolby, comprising 28 personal essays about the subject. The foreword was written by Armistead Maupin.

The book features pieces by Andrew Solomon, Cindy Chupack, Ayelet Waldman, Simon Doonan, David Ebershoff, Gigi Levangie Grazer, K. M. Soehnlein and others.

A reality television show inspired by the anthology, entitled Girls Who Like Boys Who Like Boys, aired on the Sundance Channel in Winter 2010. Dolby and de la Cruz served as Consulting Producers in the series.

== Contents ==
Gays and Gals

- Karen Robinovitz -- "Shop Girls"
- Simon Doonan -- "Fag Hags: The Laughter, The Tears, The Marabou"
- K. M. Soehnlein -- "The Collectors"
- Cecil Castellucci -- "My Fairy Godfathers"
- Mike Albo -- "That Unsettling Feeling"

Close Confidants

- Alexandra Jacobs -- "A Harvard (Fag) Hag-iography"
- James Lecesne -- "My Best Girlfriend"
- Gigi Levangie Grazer -- "My Dinners with Tom"
- David Ebershoff -- "Man's Best Friend"
- Wendy Mass -- "Marriage Material"

A Fine Romance

- Stacey Ballis -- "Everything I Always Wanted to Know About Sex (and Life) I Learned from Gay Men"
- Anna David -- "Love in Other Lifetimes"
- Tom Dolby - "Future Perfect"
- Melissa de la Cruz -- "A Manhattan Love Story"
- Sarah Kate Levy -- "Super Couple"
- Cindy Chupack -- "Get This"

Growing Up, Coming Out

- David Levithan -- "The Good Girls"
- Michael Musto -- "Welcome to My Dollhouse"
- Brian Sloan -- "Donny and Marie Don't Get Married"
- Elizabeth Spiers - "Life Before Gays"
- Zakiyyah Alexander -- "The Long Trip Home"
- Edwin John Wintle -- "Lay It All Down"
- Bennet Madison -- "Shutterspeed"

Fathers and Daughters, Mothers and Sons

- Andrew Solomon -- "In Praise of Women"
- Philip Himberg -- "Family Albums"
- Abigail Garner -- "Like Father, Like Daughter"
- Zach Udko -- "Sitting in the Dark With My Mother"
- Ayelet Waldman -- "Darling I Like You That Way"
