= Quadruplex videotape =

First practical, commercially successful analog recording video tape

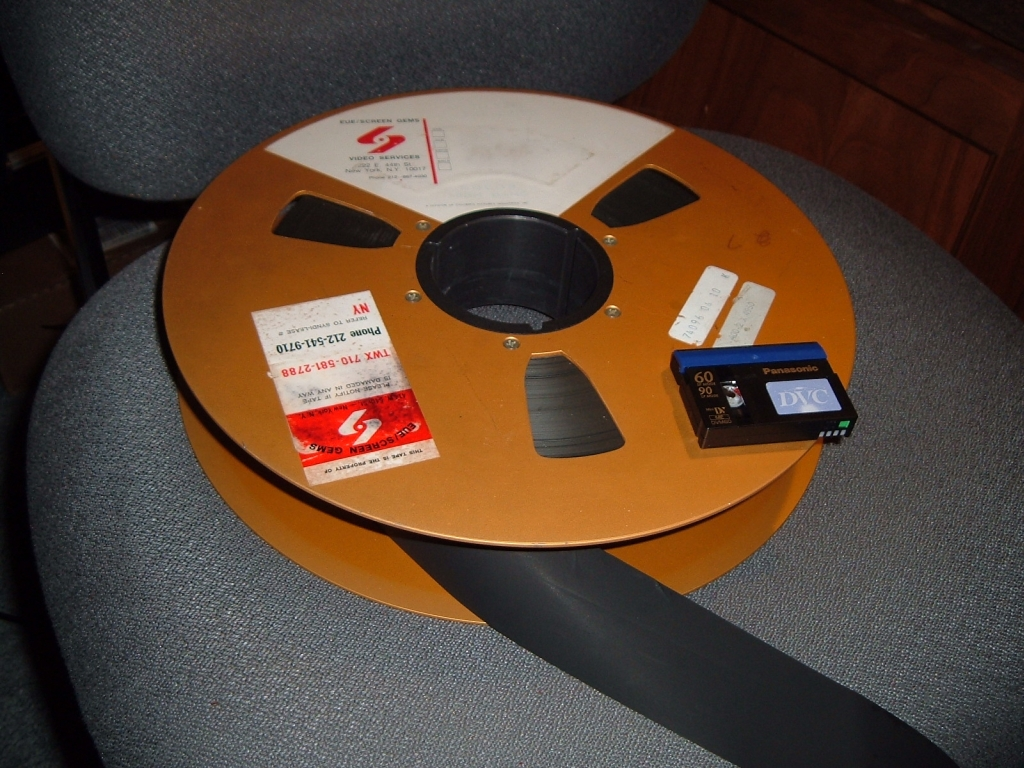
- A reel of 2-inch quadruplex videotape compared with a miniDV videocassette
- Media type: Magnetic tape
- Encoding: NTSC, PAL
- Read mechanism: Quadrature scan
- Write mechanism: Quadrature scan
- Developed by: Ampex
- Usage: Video production
- Released: 1956

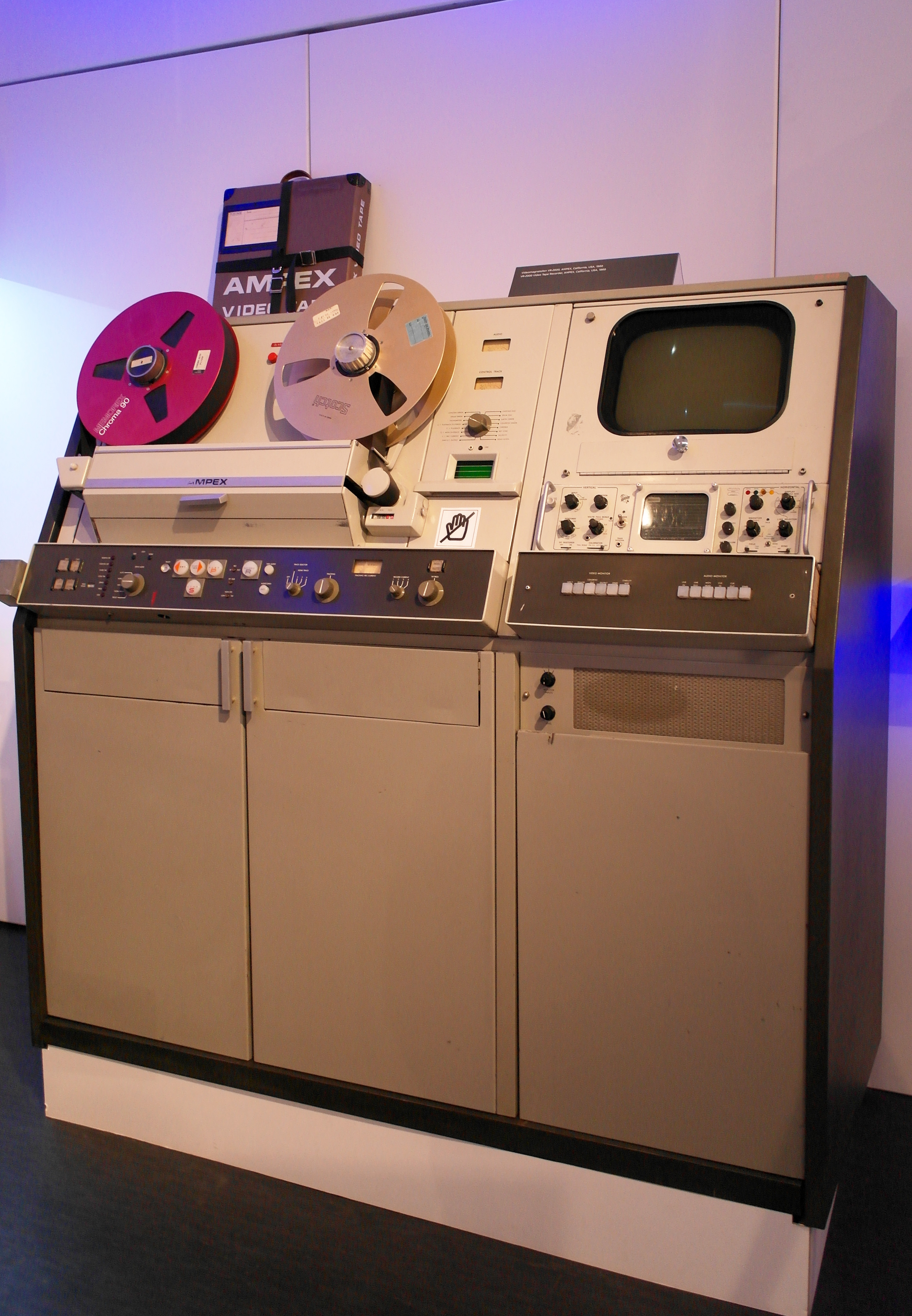
Ampex VR-2000

2-inch quadruplex videotape (also called 2" quad video tape or quadraplex) was the first practical and commercially successful analog recording video tape format. The format uses 2-inch-wide (51 mm) magnetic tape and was developed and released for the broadcast television industry in 1956 by Ampex, an American company based in Redwood City, California. The first videotape recorder using this format was built the same year. This format revolutionized broadcast television operations and television production, since the only recording medium available to the TV industry until then was motion picture film.

Since most United States network broadcast delays by the television networks at the time used kinescope film that took time to develop, the networks wanted a more practical, cost-effective, and quicker way to time-shift television programming for later airing in Western time zones than the expensive and time-consuming processing and editing of film. Faced with these challenges, broadcasters sought to adapt magnetic tape recording technology (already used for audio recording) for use with television as well. By 1954 the television industry in the US was consuming more film stock than all Hollywood studios combined.

The term "quadruplex" refers to the use of four magnetic record/play heads mounted on a headwheel spinning transversely (width-wise) across the tape at a rate of 14,386 RPM (for 960 recorded stripes per second) for NTSC 525 lines/30fps-standard quad decks and at 15,000 RPM (for 1,000 stripes per second) for those using the PAL 625 lines/25fps video standard. This method is called quadrature scanning, as opposed to the helical scan transport used by later videotape formats. The tape ran at a speed of either 7.5 or 15 in (190.5 or 381.0 mm) per second; the audio, control, and cue tracks were recorded in a standard linear fashion near the edges of the tape. The cue track was used either as a second audio track, or for recording cue tones or time code for linear video editing.

The quadruplex format employs segmented recording; each transversely recorded video track on a 2-inch quad videotape holds one-sixteenth (NTSC) or one-twentieth (PAL) of a field of interlaced video. (For NTSC systems, the math suggests 15 transverse head passes, each consisting of 16 lines of video, are required to complete one field.) This meant that 2-inch quad did not support "trick-play" functions, such as still, shuttle, and reverse or variable-speed playback. In fact, the quadruplex format could only reproduce recognizable pictures when the tape was playing at normal speed. However, it was capable of producing extremely high-quality images with a horizontal resolution of about 400 lines per picture height, and remained the de facto industry standard for television broadcasting from its inception in 1956 to the mid-1980s, when newer, smaller, and lower-maintenance videotape formats such as Type C videotape superseded it.

There were three different variations of 2-inch quad:

- Low-band, which was the first variety of quad introduced by Ampex in 1956,
- High-band, which used a wider bandwidth for recording video to the tape, resulting in higher-resolution video from the video tape recorder (VTR), and
- Super high-band, which used a pilot tone for better timebase stability, and higher coercivity tape.

Most quad machines made later in the 1960s and 1970s by Ampex can play back both low and high-band 2-inch quad tape.

== History ==
Time-shifting of television programming for the Central, Mountain, and Pacific Time Zones by the networks in the 1950s (in order to broadcast their programming at the same local time in each time zone) using kinescope films was quite a rushed and perilous ordeal. This was because there was minimal time for the West Coast studios and operations of the major television networks at the time to receive video for the programming from the East Coast (live via leased microwave relay or coaxial cable circuits provided by the phone company, AT&T), to record it to kinescope films, and to develop the film to be sent via AT&T's network as well to the networks' local affiliate stations in the western US. This usually meant the kinescope was aired almost immediately after it came straight out of the developing equipment, still warm from the film dryer. These were referred to by the networks as "hot kines". By 1954, the networks used more raw film stock for kinescopes than all of the Hollywood film studios combined, spending up to $4,000 per half hour.

Ampex, seeing the impracticality of prototype video tape recorders from Bing Crosby Enterprises (BCE) and RCA, started to develop a more practical videotape format with tape economy in mind, as well as providing a solution to the networks' West Coast delay woes. Starting in 1952, Ampex built the Mark I prototype VTR, using 2 in (51 mm)-wide tape. Ampex decided that instead of having the tape move at high speed past a stationary head to record enough bandwidth for video (as how the aforementioned prototype VTRs from BCE and RCA functioned), the head would be made to move rapidly across the relatively slow moving tape. This resulted in the Mark I using arcuate scanning, which consisted of a spinning disk with a face (where the heads were mounted) which contacted the tape (as opposed to the edge of the headwheel with transverse quadrature scanning). This resulted in an arc-shaped track being recorded across the width of the tape. Arcuate scanning resulted in a head-to-tape speed of about 2,500 in/s (63,500 mm/s), but problems with timebase stability of the reproduced video signal from the tape led Ampex to abandon arcuate scanning in favor of the more reliable transverse scanning system.

Ampex continued through the mid-1950s with the Mark II and Mark III prototype recorders. The Mark II was the first to use FM modulation to record the incoming video signal to the tape as an FM carrier modulated to the video input, resulting in a drastic improvement in video playback quality compared to the Mark I, which used AM modulation and resulted in quite poor & noisy video reproduction upon playback.

The Mark IV was the machine first publicly demonstrated at the National Association of Radio and Television Broadcasters (now the NAB) convention (the NAB Show) in Chicago on April 14, 1956. After William Lodge of CBS finished his speech, the Mark IV replayed his image and words almost immediately, causing "pandemonium" among the astonished attendees. The earlier Mark III was given some cosmetic improvements, and was also demonstrated at Ampex headquarters in Redwood City the same day. Both demonstrations were a success, and Ampex took $2 million in orders for the machine in four days.

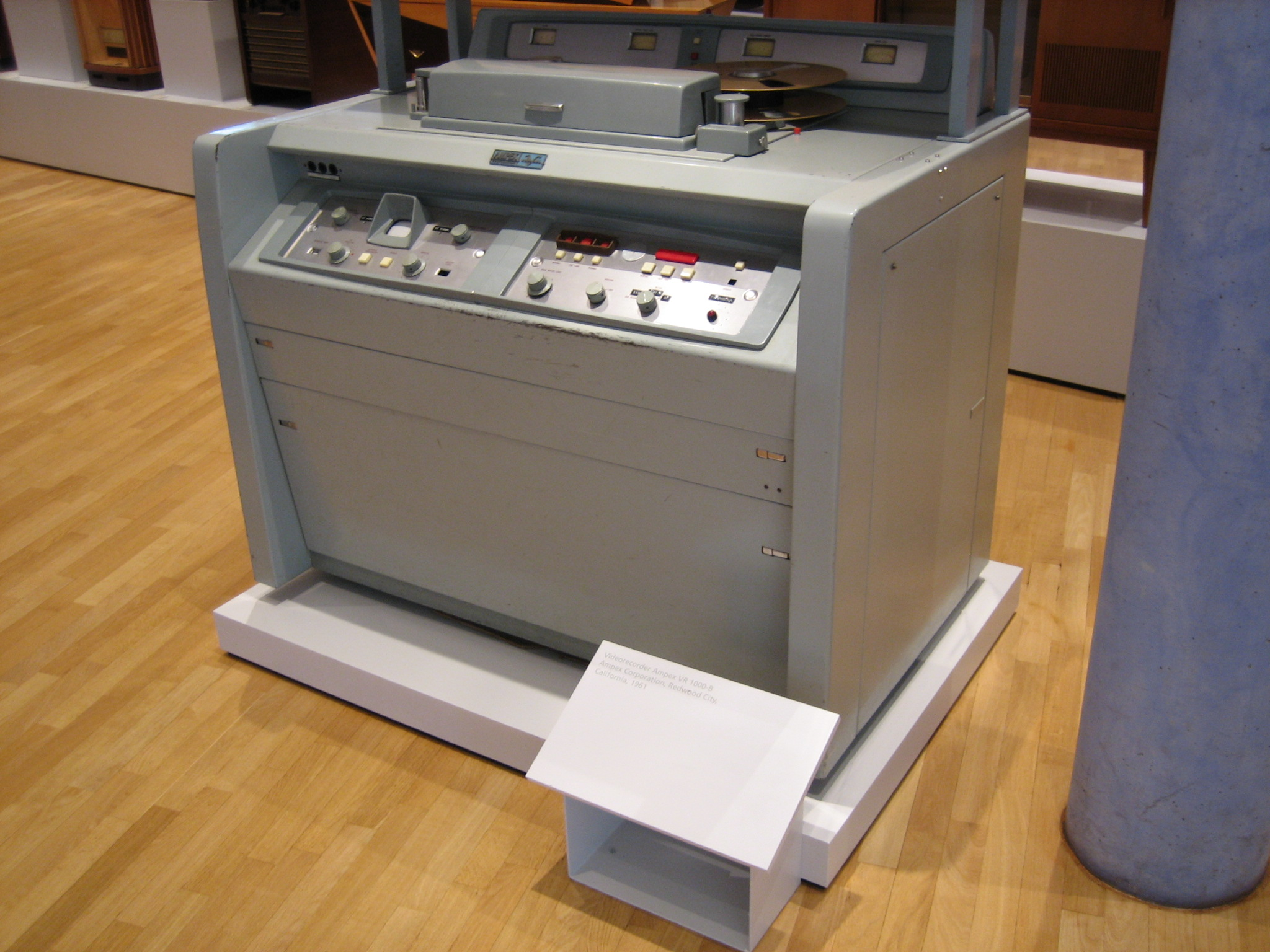
The VR 1000-B model (1961)

The quadruplex system

Ampex later released the first models of quad VTR based on the Mark IV which were also prototypes, the VRX-1000, of which 16 were made. Machines made afterward were the final production models, and were designated as the VR-1000. The advertised price for the Ampex Videotape Recorder in late 1956 was $45,000 (equivalent to $533,000 in 2025).

In 1957, shortly after Ampex's introduction of the 2-inch quad format, RCA introduced a quad-compatible VTR, the TRT-1A. RCA referred to it as a "Television Tape Recorder", since the word "videotape" was a trademark of Ampex at the time.

Ampex developed and released updated and improved models of their quad decks, beginning with the VR-1000B in mid-1959. At that time, Ampex advertised that some 360-plus VR-1000s had been sold worldwide, more than 250 in the U.S.—roughly 30 at each network, 100 by independent stations, and 20 by production companies. The second-generation VR-2000 appeared in 1964. followed by a scaled-down economy version, the VR-1200, in 1966 and the AVR series of VTRs, AVR-1, AVR-2, and AVR-3 in the 1970s. The AVR-2 was the most compact of quad VTRs, using conventional 120 volt (V) single-phase household-type AC power to operate, rather than the 208 or 220 V three-phase AC power required by larger quad machines. RCA released later models of quad VTRs as well, such as the TR-22, TR-70, and TR-600.

CBS was the first television network to use 2-inch quad videotape, using it for a West Coast delay of Douglas Edwards and the News on November 30, 1956. The CBS show Arthur Godfrey's Talent Scouts on December 24, 1956, became the first entertainment program to be broadcast live to the nation from New York and taped for a time-delayed rebroadcast in the Pacific Time Zone. On January 22, 1957, the NBC game show Truth or Consequences, produced in Hollywood, became the first program to be broadcast in all time zones from a prerecorded videotape.

The engineers at Ampex who worked on the development of 2-inch quadruplex videotape from the Mark I to the VR-1000 were Charles Ginsburg, Alex Maxey, Fred Pfost, Shelby Henderson, Charlie Anderson, and Ray Dolby (who later went on to found Dolby Laboratories).

As two inch machines became more reliable, they began to see use in outside broadcast (OB) production. The massive machines required their own truck to house and were incredibly labour-intensive requiring considerable on site maintenance. Despite this, these machines allowed for OB video engineers to provide instant replays and generate opening sequences over which captions could be added.

== Product models ==
=== Ampex ===
- VR-1000 (1956) (VRX-1000) FM Low band, three racks of tubes, monochrome. No timebase correction.
- VR-1000 "Allen" or "Allenized" update kits (made for Ampex by Steve Allen at Allen Electronics) to color solid state, FM high band updateable, solid state servo system.
- VR-1001 VR-1000 with the transport vertical.
- VR-2000 (1964) Solid state, first color-capable quad VTR with high band. Optional Editec, Dropout compensation. Mark 10 head. Analog TBC.
- VR-1100E (1966) Solid-state VR-1000.
- VR-1195 (1966) VR1100 with many Ampex updates.
- VR-1200 (1966) Solid state, color high-band. Analog TBC. Optional Editec. Scaled-down economy version of the VR-2000.
- VR-3000 (1967) Portable VTR with a Mark 11 ball-bearing head. All-format VTR (NTSC/PAL/SECAM, 15 IPS/7.5 IPS, high-band/low-band). Digital TBC was possible, but required extensive mechanical modifications to the basic unit. Battery- or line-powered.
- VR-3000B Portable VTR Improved version of VR-3000. Digital TBC was available as a plug-in accessory, and required no modifications to the basic unit. Improved batteries.
- AVR-1 (1973) Very fast VTR, vacuum columns, vacuum capstan, air transport. NTSC/PAL switchable. Analog TBC.
- ACR-25 (1974) Cart VTR, with two AVR-1 type decks.
- ACR-25B (1975) Cart VTR, ACR-25 with AVR-2 digital TBC.
- AVR-2 (1974) Digital TBC, compact Quad used in studios and remote trucks. Uses 110-volt single-phase AC (other quad models require 220-volt or 3-phase AC service, although the AVR-2 can be wired for either 110- or 220-volt service).
- AVR-3 (1975) Last Ampex Quad, digital TBC. Vacuum capstan. Super high band.

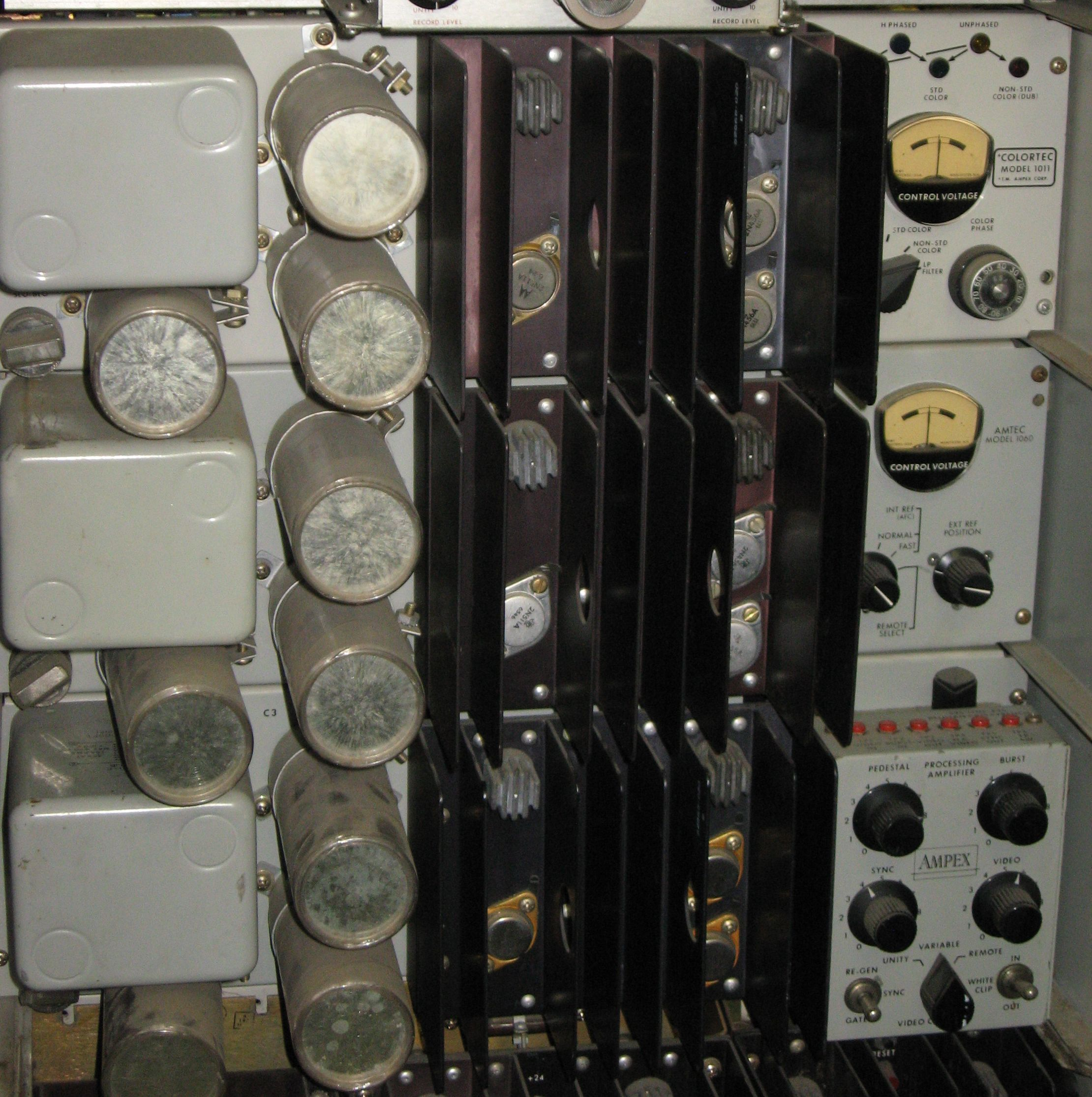
Ampex VR2000 Amtec, Colortec and Procamp at DC Video, ,

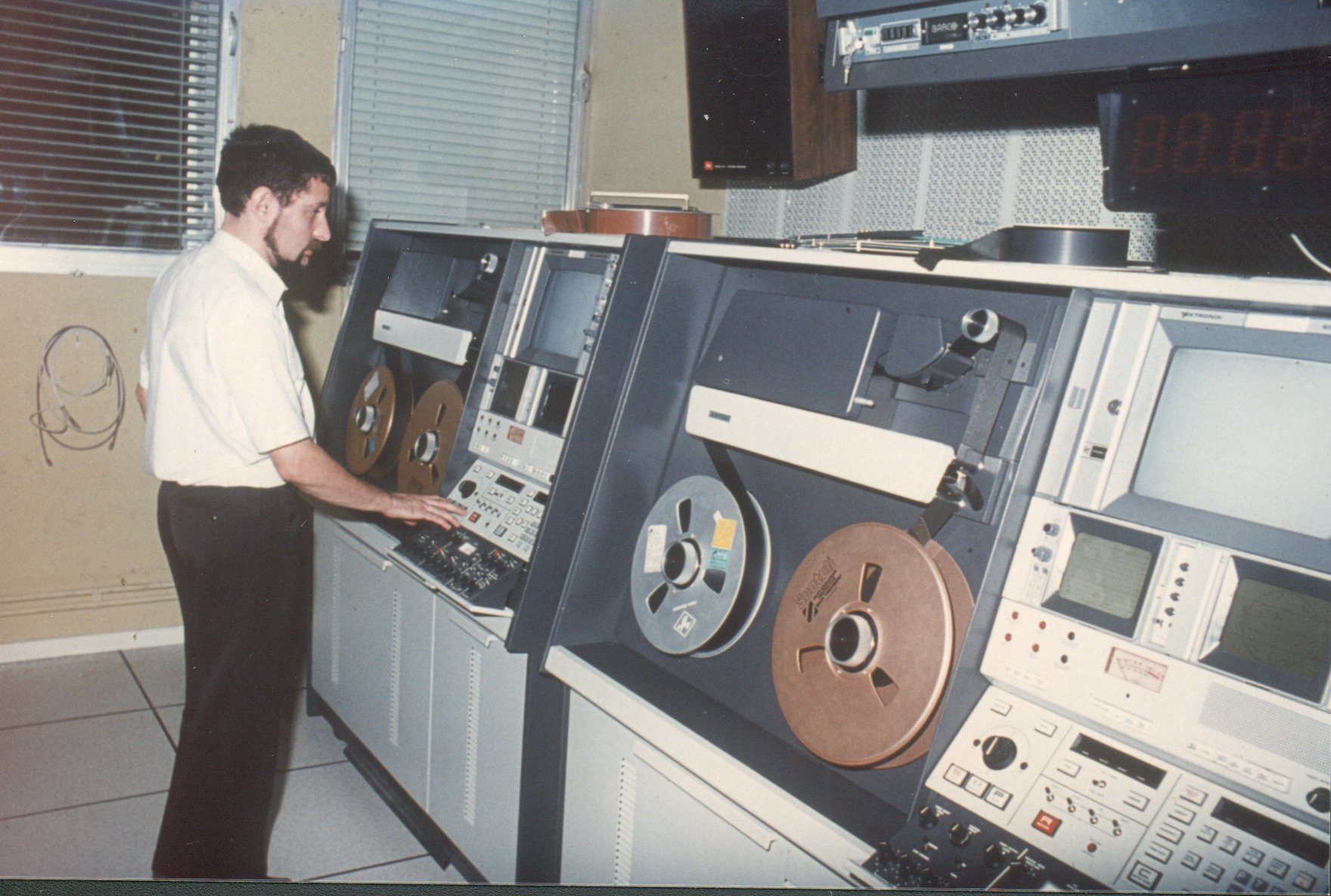
Ampex AVR 3

The VR-2000 & VR-1200 (and the VR-1100E & VR-1195, as well as some updated VR-1000 VTRs) used modules to correct the playback time base errors of the videotape.

=== RCA ===
- TRT-1A (1957) Tube VTR, 4 racks of tubes.
- TRT-1B (1959) Tube VTR, three racks. An available option for color expanded this machine to six racks, which included the color processing equipment and color monitor.
- TRT-1AC Prototype
- TR-2 (1960) Tube VTR with some solid state. Low band or monochrome.
- TR-11 (1961) Tube VTR with solid state PS-Power supply.
- TR-22 (1961) Monochrome low band, later color version.
- TR-22C (1964) High-band color.
- TR-2 (1964) Record-only solid state.
- TR-3 (1964) Playback-only solid state.
- TR-4 (1964) Both, solid state.
- TR-5 (1964) Console portable solid state.
- TR-22D (1966)
- TR-70 (1966) Solid state, high/low band with dropout compensation. High-band & low band color or monochrome. RCA's multi-standard machine
- TR-70C (1967) TR-70 with digital TBC.
- TR-50 (1967) TR-4 high band.
- TR-60 (1969) High-band & low band color or monochrome. TR-60 is an updated TR-50. RCA's multi-standard machine 405/525/625 lines. The TR-60 and TR-70 were used in a master/slave configuration with the TCR-100 cart machines timesharing the video processing circuitry of the TR-60 and TR-70 machines when a SPU was not installed with the TCR100.
- TCR-100 (1970) Dual-deck video cartridge machine. SPU-100 was the signal processing unit. Had many air-operated mechanisms
- TR-61 (1972) High-band color, digital servo system, NTSC/PAL switchable, TR-60 is an updated TR-50.
- TPR-10 (1975) High-band color portable. Larger than a VR-3000, Had color playback, US air force use a few.
- TR-600 (1972) Last RCA Quad. Digital TBC, compact quad used in studios and remote trucks.

=== Bosch Fernseh ===
- BM-20 B&W Quadruplex tube TVR (1963–1970).
- BCM-40 (1970–1972) Solid state, analog TBC.
- BCM-40C (1972–1976) Updated BCM-40

=== Комета (Kometa), Soviet Union ===
- Кадр-1 (Kadr-1) - B&W, tubes (1964);
- Кадр-1Ц (Kadr-1Ts) - Prototype unit, modified for color recording testing (1964);
- Кадр-2 (Kadr-2) - Prototype unit, B&W, solid state (1966);
- Кадр-3 (Kadr-3) - Color, solid state (1967);
- Кадр-3П (Kadr-3P) - 2-racks version intended for production trucks (1969);
- Кадр-3ПМ (Kadr-3PM) - Modified for timecode-based editing (1980);
- Кадр-5 (Kadr-5) - Fast editing VTR, vacuum columns (1976).

=== ЛОМО (LOMO), Soviet Union ===
- КМЗИ-1 (KMZI-1) - Prototype unit, B&W, tubes. The first soviet VTR. Based on Quad format, but used 70-mm tape instead of 2-inch (1959);
- КМЗИ-4 (KMZI-4) - Production version of КМЗИ-1, was used for regular broadcast (1960);
- КМЗИ-6 (KMZI-6) - B&W, tubes. The first mass-produced VTR. Was used for the first experimental colour recording in SECAM encoding (1962);
- КМЗИ-12 (KMZI-12) - B&W, tubes. Had an interchangeable head block for compatibility with 2-inch tape (1965);
- Электрон-2 (Electron-2) - B&W, solid state, fully compliant with Quad format (1966);
- Электрон-2М (Electron-2M) - Color version (1966).

=== Others ===
- Sony made an experimental 2" VTR in 1958, after seeing an Ampex VTR at NHK, but never sold any 2" quadruplex VTRs.
- The VA-50 and VA-100 sold by Visual Electronics, USA. (1965-1970) by Jim Tharpe. Use many parts from Steve Allen, these at first were Allenized VR-1000s, sold as RB 1000. Then Visual switch to Allenized Bosch BM-20, colorizing them as VA-50 and VA-100.
- WZT (Warszawskie Zakłady Telewizyjne, Poland) made VTR MW-623 (prototype in 1963) then improved to MW-645 (1965, commonly used in Polish Television) and finally 100% solid state MW-700C (1971). The VTRs were never sold abroad.

== 2-inch quad fate ==
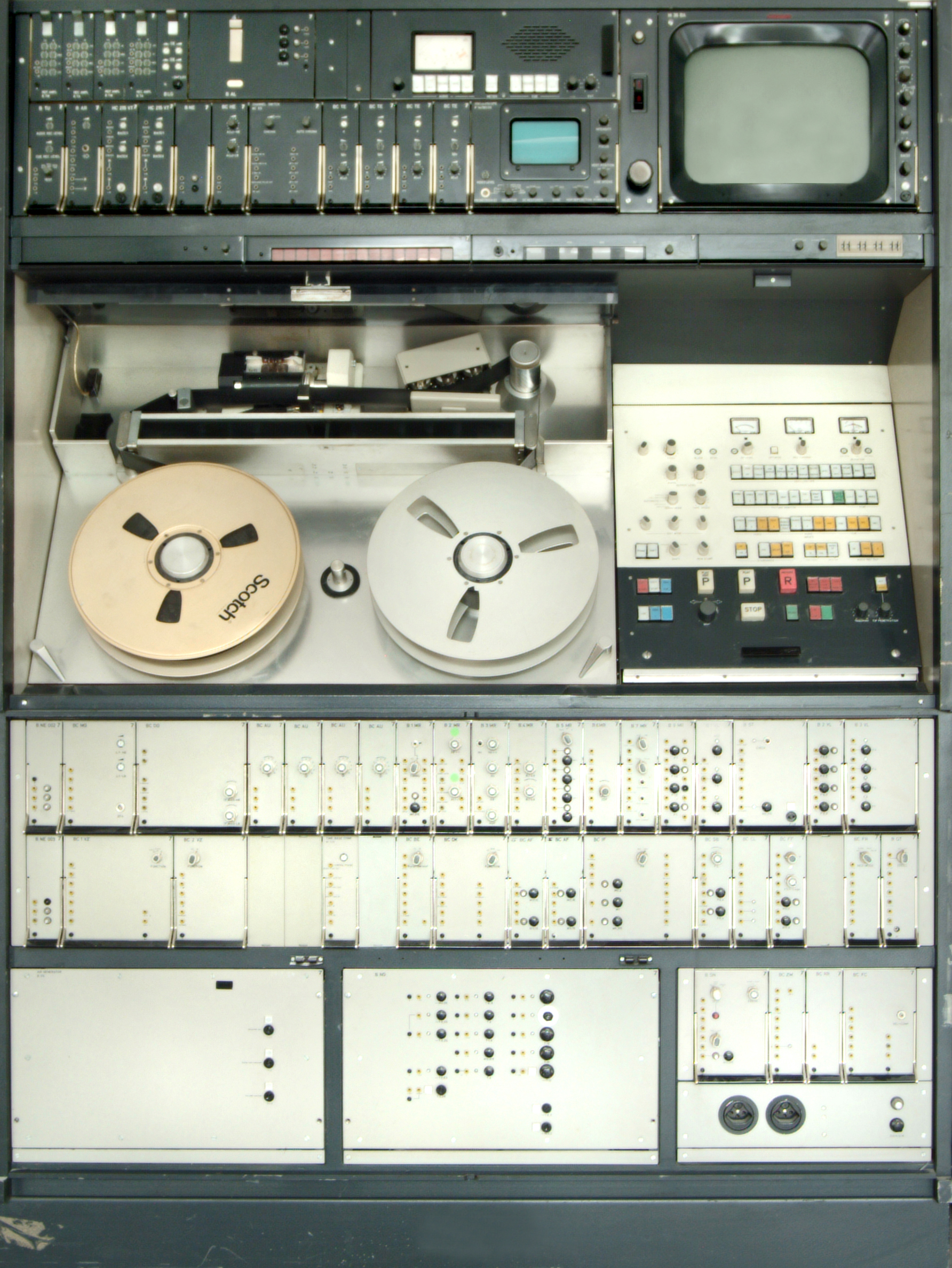
Bosch Quad VTR Model BCM 40

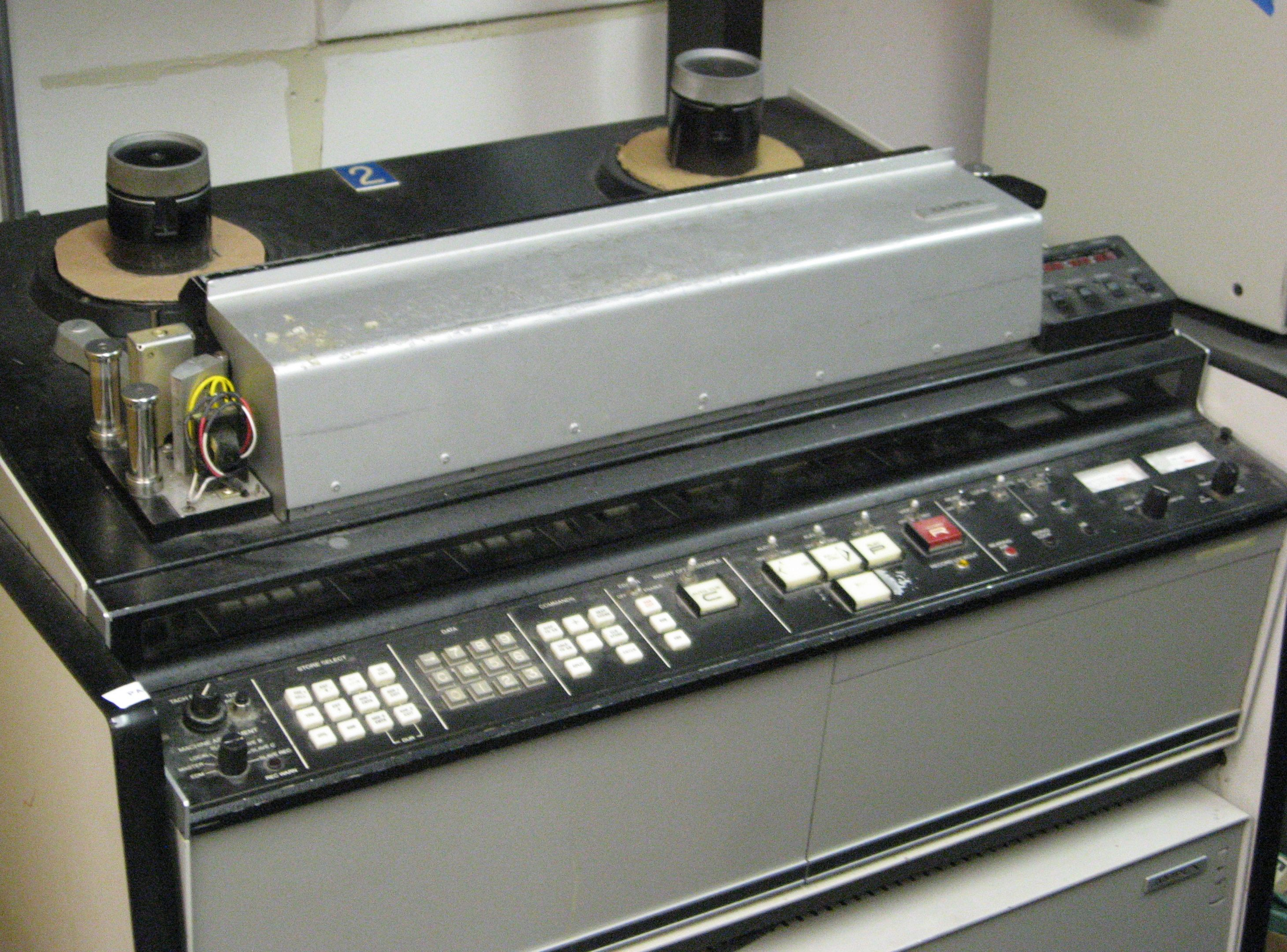
Ampex AVR-2

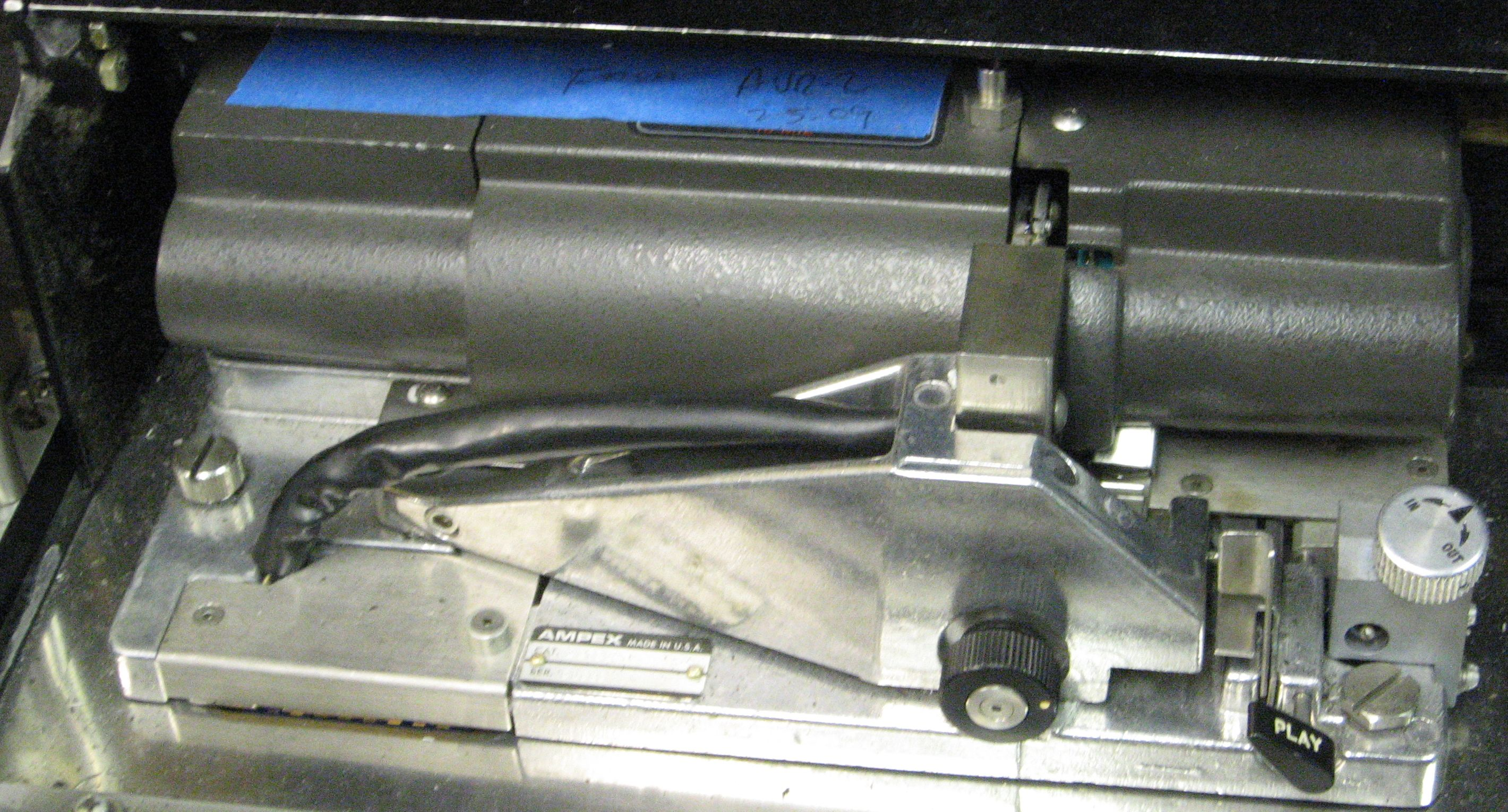
Ampex AVR-2 Video Head

2-inch quad is no longer used as a mainstream format in TV broadcasting and video production, having long ago been supplanted by easier-to-use, more practical and lower-maintenance analog tape formats like 1" Type C (1976), U-matic and Betacam. Television and video industry changes to digital video tape (DVCAM, DVCPro and Digital Betacam) and high-definition (HDCAM) made analog tape formats increasingly obsolete.

Operation of VR-1000-era machines required the skills of a highly trained video engineer. When a tape was changed, the operator spent as much as half-an-hour, "lining-up" the VTR—that is, carrying out specialized technical adjustments to calibrate the machine to the tape before it was ready for playback. From VR-1200/2000 onward, improvements in head manufacturing/refurbishing tolerances, timebase correction, and greater thermal stability of solid-state electronics made tape changes possible in under a minute and needed servo calibrations only once per shift. From AVR-1 onward, servos were self-calibrating and tape changes were as fast as the operator could articulate threading.

The few quadruplex VTRs which remain in service are used for the transfer and/or restoration of archival 2-inch quad videotape material to newer data storage formats, although mainstream TV serials from the 1950s to late 1960s have mostly already been remastered onto more modern media some years ago, even digitized within the last decade.

== Specifications ==
- 2 Inch open reel to reel analog video system
- Vacuum guide to support videotape for record
- Tape speed 15 ips. (381 mm/s) [7.5 ips in half speed mode)
- Video record FM signal
- One analog control track (240 Hz) 20 mils [bottom of videotape]
- Two analog audio tracks: 2 audio tracks or one audio and one cue tone track or one audio track and one linear timecode track
- Analog audio track 70 mils [top of videotape]
- Analog audio cue track 20 mils
- Video track angle 89.5 deg.
- Video track height/length ~ 1.82 inches, ~ 46.2mm
- Four video record/play heads at 90 deg. (rotary transformer – Ampex, rotary brush – RCA)
- Drum dia. 2 inches – (50.8mm)
- Video penetration ~ .002 inches – 50 micron
- 525-lines video has 32 video tracks
- 625-lines video has 40 video tracks
- Video scanner rotation: 525 line 14,400 rpm (240 rps) (1,000 stripes per second), 625 15,000 rpm
- Video head write speed: 525 line 1508 ips (38.3 m/s), 625 39.9 m/sec (1570.8 ips)
- Video track width 10 mils – .25 mm
- Video track pitch 15.6 mils – .40 mm
- 16.4 horizontal lines per head in 525. (64 lines recorded per rotation of the head drum assembly)
- Video track per second 960.
- Studio reel ~60 minutes, 4,800 feet.
- Video FM modes: Low band, High Band, B&W, Super High Band

The tape used in quadruplex machines may have magnetic particles oriented transversely, to increase the magnetic field strength of the tape when read transversely. This allows for higher signal to noise ratios and the possibility of reducing linear or longitudinal tape speeds. The particles are oriented by applying a strong transverse magnetic field during manufacturing after the particles are applied but before the tape is baked to fix the particles in place.

== See also ==
- VTR
- Videotape
- Ampex 2 inch helical VTR
- Contrast with helical scan recording
- Erhard Kietz's work at Ampex
- Lunar Orbiter Image Recovery Project, recovered still images from physically similar tapes
