= Misguided Angel =

Misguided Angel may refer to:

- Misguided Angel, the fifth book in the Blue Bloods novel series
- "Misguided Angel", a song on the album The Trinity Session by Cowboy Junkies
