= Lavender's Blue =

English folk song and nursery rhyme dating to the 17th century

- English folk song
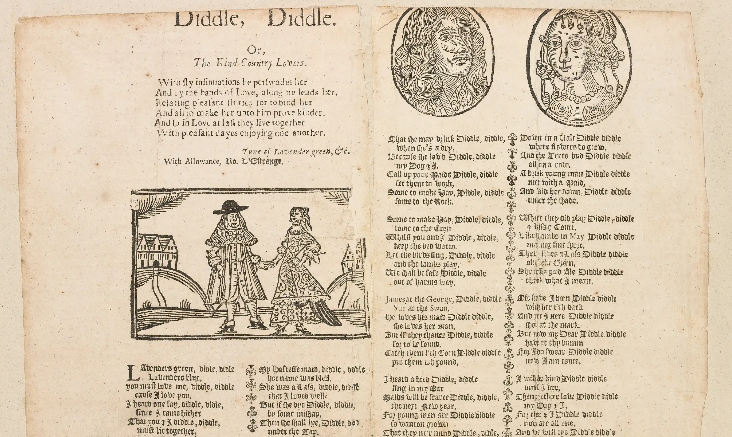
- A 17th-century broadside version of the ballad
- Catalogue: Roud 3483
- Genre: Nursery rhyme
- Published: English broadside (before 1680)

"Lavender's Blue" (also called "Lavender Blue") is an English folk song and nursery rhyme from the 17th century. Its Roud Folk Song Index number is 3483. It has been recorded in various forms and some pop versions have been hits in the U.S. and U.K. charts.

== Lyrics ==
There are as many as thirty verses to the song, and many variations of each verse. A typical version, described by James Halliwell in 1849, is:

Lavender's blue, dilly dilly, lavender's green,
When I am king, dilly dilly, you shall be queen:
Who told you so, dilly dilly, who told you so?
'Twas mine own heart, dilly dilly, that told me so.

Call up your men, dilly dilly, set them to work,
Some with a rake, dilly dilly, some with a fork;
Some to make hay, dilly dilly, some to thresh corn,
Whilst you and I, dilly dilly, keep ourselves warm.

If you should die, dilly dilly, as it may hap,
You shall be buried, dilly dilly, under the tap;
Who told you so, dilly dilly, pray tell me why?
That you might drink, dilly dilly, when you are dry.

== Origins ==
The earliest surviving version of the song is in a broadside printed in England between 1672 and 1679, under the name Diddle Diddle, or The Kind Country Lovers. The broadside indicates it is to be sung to the tune of "Lavender Green", implying that a tune by that name was already in existence. The lyrics printed in the broadside are fairly bawdy, celebrating sex and drinking.

According to Robert B. Waltz, "The singer tells his lady that she must love him because he loves her. He tells of a vale where young man and maid have lain together, and suggests that they might do the same". Waltz cites Sandra Stahl Dolby as describing this broadside version as being about a girl named Nell keeping the singer's bed warm.

Here is the first of ten verses:

Lavender's green, diddle, diddle,
Lavender's blue
You must love me, diddle, diddle,
cause I love you,
I heard one say, diddle, diddle,
since I came hither,
That you and I, diddle, diddle,
must lie together.

Both Waltz (citing Eloise Hubbard Linscott) and Halliwell have noted the song's association with Twelfth Night and the choosing of the king and queen of the festivities of that holiday.

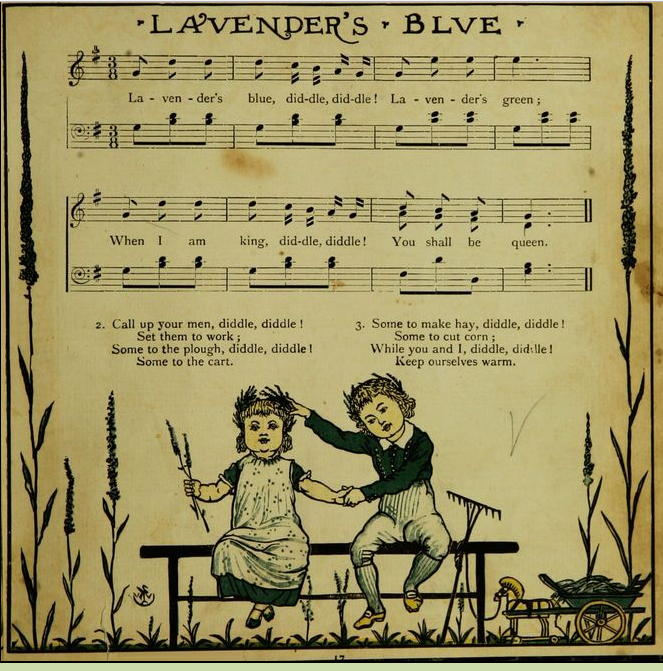
Lyrics and illustration for "Lavender's Blue" in The Baby's Opera – A Book of Old Rhymes and the Music by the Earliest Masters

"Lavender's Blue" emerged as a children's song in Songs for the Nursery in 1805 in the form:

Lavender blue and Rosemary green,
When I am king you shall be queen;
Call up my maids at four o'clock,
Some to the wheel and some to the rock;
Some to make hay and some to shear corn,
And you and I will keep the bed warm.

Similar versions appeared in collections of rhymes throughout the 19th century.

=== Melody ===
Source

== Revival ==
=== 1949 ===
A version, titled "Lavender Blue (Dilly Dilly)", was featured in the 1948 Walt Disney film So Dear to My Heart, where it was sung by Burl Ives. This version was nominated for Academy Award for Best Original Song in 1949 and was credited to Eliot Daniel (music) and Larry Morey (lyrics). The appearance of "Lavender Blue" in the Disney film sparked a revival of interest in the song.

Ives' version of "Lavender Blue" was recorded in December 1948 and released as a single in January 1949. As was common for pop songs in those days, several other singers released versions at near the same time: Sammy Kaye in 1949, which charted at No. 5; Dinah Shore, whose version went to No. 1 on the Australian chart and was the title track of her album Lavender Blue. Vera Lynn's version of "Lavender Blue" was issued on the B side of her single "Again", which reached the Billboard magazine Best Seller chart on January 21, 1949.

=== Later 20th Century ===
Benjamin Britten wrote Lavender's Blue into his 1954 opera The Turn of The Screw, where it is sung by the two children, Miles and Flora.

In 1959, Sammy Turner released a rhythm and blues version produced by Jerry Leiber and Mike Stoller which reached #3 on the Billboard Hot 100.

In 1985, the British rock band Marillion included a song called "Lavender" on their album Misplaced Childhood. The song had lyrics derived from "Lavender's Blue" and became a number 5 hit on the UK singles chart.
