= Last Weekend (2014 film) =

- Directed by: Tom Dolby; Tom Williams
- Written by: Tom Dolby
- Produced by: Mike S. Ryan
- Starring: Patricia Clarkson; Zachary Booth; Jayma Mays; Joseph Cross; Rutina Wesley; Fran Kranz; Devon Graye; Alexia Rasmussen; Julie Carmen; Judith Light; Chris Mulkey
- Cinematography: Paula Huidobro
- Edited by: Michael R. Miller; David Gray
- Music by: Stephen Barton
- Distributed by: IFC/Sundance Selects
- Release date: May 2, 2014 (SFIFF)
- Running time: 94 minutes
- Country: United States
- Language: English
- Box office: $26,111

Last Weekend is a 2014 American comedy/drama film starring Patricia Clarkson, Zachary Booth, and Joseph Cross. The film premiered at the San Francisco International Film Festival on May 2, 2014. In May, the film was acquired for theatrical release and iTunes/VOD on August 29, 2014, by IFC/Sundance Selects. The film will also open the Provincetown International Film Festival on June 18, 2014. Last Weekend was filmed entirely on location in Lake Tahoe, California. It was the first feature film in thirteen years to be shot entirely in the area.

== Synopsis ==
When an affluent matriarch gathers her dysfunctional family on Labor Day weekend at their Northern California lake house, her carefully constructed weekend begins to fall apart at the seams, leading her to question her own role in the family.

== Cast ==
- Patricia Clarkson as Celia Green
- Zachary Booth as Theo Green
- Joseph Cross as Roger Green
- Chris Mulkey as Malcolm Green
- Devon Graye as Luke Caswell
- Alexia Rasmussen as Vanessa Sanford
- Rutina Wesley as Nora Finley-Perkins
- Jayma Mays as Blake Curtis
- Judith Light as Veronika Goss
- Julio Oscar Mechoso as Hector Castillo
- Mary Kay Place as Jeannie
- Sheila Kelley as Vivian
- Julie Carmen as Maria Castillo
- Fran Kranz as Sean Oakes
- Ray O'Brien as Paramedic

== Reception ==
On the review aggregator website Rotten Tomatoes, 38% of 21 critics' reviews are positive, with an average rating of 4.3/10. Metacritic, which uses a weighted average, assigned the film a score of 40 out of 100, based on 10 critics, indicating "mixed or average" reviews.

In his review in Slant Magazine, Drew Hunt gave it a 1/4 rating saying that "the film's attempt at political commentary amounts to a half-baked treatise on good governance in the face of tyranny and socioeconomic exploitation." In The Hollywood Reporter, David Rooney said that it "is too muted in its catharsis and too overcrowded with superfluous characters to be fully satisfying, but the delicate central performance keeps it watchable."
