= Sammy Turner =

American singer (1932–2026)

- Born: Samuel L. Black; June 2, 1932; Paterson, New Jersey, U.S.
- Died: January 22, 2026 (aged 93)
- Occupation: Singer

Samuel L. Black (June 2, 1932 – January 22, 2026), better known as Sammy Turner, was an American singer who was popular at the end of the 1950s.

== Life and career ==
Sammy Turner was born on June 2, 1932 in Paterson, New Jersey, where he also grew up. He developed an early interest in singing and songwriting, and on the outbreak of the Korean War in 1950 he enlisted in the U.S. Air Force and saw active service as a paratrooper.

He was signed to Bigtop Records late in the 1950s, and his releases featured production from Jerry Leiber and Mike Stoller. He scored several hits on the Billboard Hot 100 in 1959 and 1960; the biggest were "Lavender Blue", a number-three chart record on the Billboard Hot 100, and originally a hit for Sammy Kaye in 1949, and "Always", a number-one hit for Vincent Lopez in 1926. Later in the 1960s Turner recorded for Motown Records.

Turner died on January 22, 2026, at the age of 93.

== Singles ==
Year	Title	Chart Positions		
Year	Title	U.S. Billboard Hot 100	U.S. R&B Singles	UK Singles Chart
1959	"Symphony"	82	-	-
1959	"Lavender Blue"	3	14	-
1959	"Always"	19	2	26
1960	"Paradise"	46	13	-
