= Ray Dolby =

American electrical engineer and inventor (1933–2013)

Ray Dolby OBE HonFREng
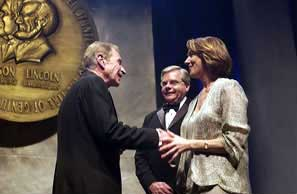
- Dolby (left) being inducted into the National Inventors Hall of Fame, 2004
- Born: Ray Milton Dolby; January 18, 1933; Portland, Oregon, U.S.
- Died: September 12, 2013 (aged 80); San Francisco, California, U.S.
- Education: Stanford University (BE); Pembroke College, Cambridge (PhD)
- Spouse: Dagmar Bäumert (m. 1966)
- Children: Tom Dolby; David Dolby
- Engineering career
- Discipline: Electrical engineering, physics
- Institutions: Dolby Laboratories
- Projects: Dolby NR
- Significant design: Surround sound
- Awards: National Medal of Technology (1997); Honorary Officer of the Order of the British Empire (1987); Marshall Scholarship (1961)
- Military career
- Branch: United States Army

Ray Milton Dolby (/ˈdoʊlbi, ˈdɒl-/; January 18, 1933 – September 12, 2013) was an American engineer and inventor of the noise reduction system known as Dolby NR, which has been said to have "transformed sound reproduction".

In the 1950s he contributed to development of the video tape recorder while at Ampex, and in 1965 he founded Dolby Laboratories in London. There he invented and patented a method of noise reduction for use in analog recording which was widely adopted for the cassette tape. The company moved to California in 1976 and went on to develop audio and video formats for films, home video recorders, home theater, television broadcasts, and video streaming services.

== Early life and education ==
Dolby was born in Portland, Oregon, the son of Esther Eufemia (née Strand) and Earl Milton Dolby, an inventor. He attended Sequoia High School (class of 1951) in Redwood City, California. As a teenager in the decade following World War II, he held part-time and summer jobs at Ampex in Redwood City, working with their first audio tape recorder in 1949. While at San Jose State College and later at Stanford University (interrupted by two years of Army service), he worked on early prototypes of video tape recorder technologies for Alexander M. Poniatoff and Charlie Ginsburg.

In 1957, Dolby received his B.Sc. in electrical engineering from Stanford. He subsequently won a Marshall Scholarship for a Ph.D (1961) in physics from the University of Cambridge, England, where he was a Research Fellow at Pembroke College and completed his PhD, "Long wavelength X-ray microanalysis" under the supervision of Ellis Cosslett.

== Career ==
As a non degree-holding "consultant", Dolby played a key role in the effort that led Ampex to unveil their prototype Quadruplex videotape recorder in April 1956 which soon entered production.

After Cambridge, Dolby acted as a technical advisor to the United Nations in India until 1965, when he returned to England, where he founded Dolby Laboratories in London with a staff of four. In that same year, 1965, he invented the Dolby noise-reduction system, a form of audio signal processing for analog tape recorders. His first U.S. patent application was made in 1969, four years later. The system was first used by Decca Records in the UK.

The Dolby B consumer noise-reduction system works by compressing (boosting) low-level high-frequency sounds during recording and expanding (decreasing) them symmetrically during playback, which also decreases inherent tape noise. This reduces the audible level of tape hiss. The professional Type A system operates on four different frequency bands, and the final SR system on ten.

After his pioneering work with audiotape noise reduction, Dolby sought to improve film sound. As Dolby Laboratories' corporate history explains:

Upon investigation, Dolby found that many of the limitations in optical sound stemmed directly from its significantly high background noise. To filter this noise, the high-frequency response of theatre playback systems was deliberately curtailed… To make matters worse, to increase dialogue intelligibility over such systems, sound mixers were recording soundtracks with so much high-frequency pre-emphasis that high distortion resulted.

The first film with Dolby sound was A Clockwork Orange (1971), which used Dolby noise reduction on all pre-mixes and masters, but a conventional optical sound track on release prints. Callan (1974) was the first film with a Dolby-encoded optical soundtrack. The first true LCRS (Left-Center-Right-Surround) soundtrack was encoded on the movie A Star Is Born in 1976. In less than ten years, 6,000 cinemas worldwide were equipped to use Dolby Stereo sound.

Dolby then developed a digital surround sound compression scheme for the cinema. Dolby Stereo Digital (now simply called Dolby Digital) was first featured on the 1992 film Batman Returns. Dolby Digital is now found in the HDTV (ATSC) standard of the United States, DVD players, and many satellite-TV and cable-TV receivers.

Dolby was a Fellow and past president of the Audio Engineering Society.

== Death and legacy ==
Dolby died of leukemia on September 12, 2013, at his home in San Francisco at the age of 80. Dolby was survived by his wife Dagmar, two sons, Tom and David, and four grandchildren. Kevin Yeaman, president and chief executive of Dolby Laboratories, said, "Today we lost a friend, mentor and true visionary." Neil Portnow, president of the National Academy of Recording Arts and Sciences, said Dolby had "changed the way we listen to music and movies for nearly 50 years" and that Dolby's "technologies have become an essential part of the creative process for recording artists and filmmakers, ensuring his remarkable legacy for generations to come."

In his will, Dolby bequeathed £35 million to Pembroke College, Cambridge, reportedly the largest single donation received by any college in the university's history. In December 2017 it was announced that his family had donated a further £85m from his estate to Cambridge University's Cavendish Laboratory which funded a physics professorship and the building of the Ray Dolby Centre. Funding for the new building was supplemented with £75m from the UK government, and it was completed in 2024; its facilities include lecture halls and 173 laboratories.

In 2022, the Dolby Family Fund for Excellence in Physics was expected to fund further academic posts and PhD studentships, as well as an annual symposium.

== Awards and honors ==
- 1971 — AES Silver Medal
- 1979 — 51st Academy Awards — Academy Award, Scientific or Technical (Scientific and Engineering Award) [plaque]
- 1983 — SMPTE Progress Medal For his contributions to theater sound and his continuing work in noise reduction and quality improvements in audio and video systems and as a prime inventor of the videotape recorder
- 1985 — SMPTE Alexander M. Poniatoff Gold Medal
- 1986 — honorary Officer of the Most Excellent Order of the British Empire (OBE)
- 1988 — Eduard Rhein Ring of Honor from the German Eduard Rhein Foundation
- 1989 — 61st Academy Awards — Academy Award, Scientific or Technical (Academy Award of Merit) [statuette]
- 1989 — Emmy Award by the National Academy of Television Arts and Sciences (NATAS)
- 1992 — AES Gold Medal
- 1995 — Special Merit/Technical Grammy Award
- 1997 — U.S. National Medal of Technology
- 1997 — IEEE Masaru Ibuka Consumer Electronics Award
- 1999 — honorary Doctor degree by the University of York
- 2000 — honorary Doctor of Science degree from Cambridge University
- 2003 — Charles F. Jenkins Lifetime Achievement Award by the Academy of Television Arts & Sciences
- 2004 — inducted into the National Inventors Hall of Fame and the Consumer Electronics Hall of Fame
- 2004 — elected an Honorary Fellow of the Royal Academy of Engineering
- 2010 — IEEE Edison Medal
- 2012 — Berlin International Film Festival Berlinale Kamera
- 2014 — Induction into the Television Hall of Fame
- 2015 — Star on the Hollywood Walk of Fame

== U.S. patents ==
- U.S. patent 3,631,365, Frequency selective, symmetric signal compressor/expander (Dolby noise reduction); application filed October 20, 1969, patent granted December 28, 1971
