= Blue Bloods (novel series) =

Vampire novel series by Melissa de la Cruz

- Author: Melissa de la Cruz
- Language: English
- Series: Blue Bloods
- Genre: Teen; Fantasy; Mystery; Vampire; Romance
- Publisher: Hyperion Paperbacks
- Publication place: United States
- Media type: Print

Blue Bloods is a series of vampire novels by Melissa de la Cruz. The series is set in Manhattan, New York. The complete series comprises seven books: Blue Bloods, Masquerade, Revelations, The Van Alen Legacy, Misguided Angel, Lost in Time, and Gates of Paradise. The author also wrote two companion novels, Keys to the Repository and Bloody Valentine, along with two spin-off series, Wolf Pact and Witches of East End. Blue Bloods: A Graphic Novel was published on January 15, 2013, also the publication date of the final novel in the series.

The series follows its characters through numerous adventures involving romance, loyalty, mystery, and war.

Melissa de la Cruz has begun a second Blue Bloods series, Vampires of Manhattan.

== Characters ==
=== The Van Alen family ===
Schuyler Theodora Elizabeth Van Alen Chase (Dimidium Cognatus - 'half-human, half-vampire') (Sky-ler) A half-blood vampire, the first and only one of her kind. The main character of the series, she must help solve the mystery of the Blue Bloods slayings, and the existence of their ancient rivals, the Silver Bloods.

Allegra Van Alen Chase (Gabrielle, The Uncorrupted, the Virtuous, the Messenger, Archangel of the Light). Schuyler's mother. Her "bondmate" is Charles Force, but she forsook her bond with him to be with her "human familiar", Stephen Chase. According to the Repository files, she subsequently fell into a coma when Schuyler was three. The most powerful of the seven messengers.

Cordelia Van Alen (Seraphiel, Angel of Song) Bondmate of Lawrence Van Alen, and Schuyler's grandmother and guardian.

Lawrence Van Alen (Metraton, Heavenly Scribe) Bondmate of Cordelia Van Alen, and Schuyler's grandfather. He is "Enmortal" and therefore does not adhere to the cycles of birth and death as other vampires do; he remains in the same physical shell for centuries.

Stephen "Ben" Bendix Chase (Human Familiar) Schuyler Van Alen's father, and Allegra's "human familiar".

=== Schuyler's friends ===
Oliver Hazard-Perry (Human Familiar/Human Conduit) Schuyler Van Alen's best friend, conduit, and human familiar.

Dylan Ward (Xathanael, the Hidden One) Notorious "bad boy". Romantically linked to Bliss Llewellyn.

=== The Force family ===
Benjamin "Jack" Hamilton Force (Abbadon, Angel of Destruction, Twin Angel of the Apocalypse, The Hammer Blow, The Enforcer, The Unlikely, Destroyer of Worlds) His bondmate is his twin sister, Mimi Force, but he forsook their bond to be with his true love, Schuyler Van Alen.

Madeleine "Mimi" Alexis Force (Azrael, Angel of Death, Twin Angel of the Apocalypse, Light Destroyer) Schuyler Van Alen's nemesis. Jack's twin sister and bondmate. After Jack forsook their bond, she chose to be with her true love, Kingsley Martin.

Charles (Van Alen) Force (Michael, Pure of Heart, the Valiant, Prince of the Angels, Supreme Commander of the Lord's Armies, Archangel of the Light) Allegra Van Alen's former bondmate and twin brother, and Jack and Mimi's father. He changed his last name to Force after Allegra broke their bond.

Trinity Burden Force (Sandalphon, Angel of Silence) Charles Force's wife, and Jack and Mimi's mother. Her bondmate, Salgiel, was lost during the Great War in Rome.

=== The Llewellyn family ===
Bliss Llewellyn (Azazel, The Darkling, Lupus Theliel, Angel of Love, Wolfsbane) A good friend and half-sister of Schuyler Van Alen, though she was once more closely associated with Mimi Force. Born from a union between Lucifer and Gabrielle (Allegra Van Alen)

Forsyth Llewellyn (Malakai, the Steward) State senator, Bliss's father, bondmate of BobiAnne Llewellyn.

BobiAnne Llewellyn (Andela, of the Dawn) Bondmate of Forsyth Llewellyn, Bliss's step-mother.

Jordan Llewellyn (Pistis Sophia, Elder of the Elders, the Watcher) Bliss's younger half-sister, and daughter of Forsyth and BobiAnne Llewellyn.

=== Other characters ===
Kingsley Drexel Martin (Araquiel, Angel of Vengeance, The Angel with Two Faces) A reformed Silver Blood and an Enmortal. A Venator (the Conclave's secret police force), and Mimi's true love.

Augusta "Aggie" Carondolet A Blue Blood student at Duchesne, the vampires' prestigious private school, and one of Mimi's friends. The first victim of the New York slayings by the Silver Bloods.

Dehua Chen (Xi Wangmu, Angel of Immortality) A Venator from the Blue Blood coven in Shanghai, China. Twin sister of Deming Chen.

Deming Chen (Kuan Yin, Angel of Mercy) A Venator from the Blue Blood coven in Shanghai, China. Twin sister of Dehua Chen.

Sam and Ted Lennox Twin brothers and Venators allied with Mimi and Kingsley. Are also the Twin Angels of the West Winds.

=== House of the Morningstar (Morgenstern) ===
Lucifer (The Morningstar, Lightbringer, Prince of Heaven, Prince of Darkness, Archangel of the Dark) Leader of the Silver Bloods.

Leviathan (The Giant, the Kraken, Goliath of the Glom) Brother of Lucifer.

Nan Cutler (Harbonah, Angel of Annihilation) The "Regent" of the Conclave; the second-highest-ranking Blue Blood in the New York Coven.

== Vampires ==
=== Blue Bloods ===
The Blue Bloods, Lucifer's loyal army of angels who fought alongside him in an epic war when he sought to win the heavenly throne, are fallen angels forced to live on earth as vampires. They have excellent speed, high intelligence, a photographic memory, and enhanced senses. When victory was nearly within reach for Lucifer, the twin angels Abbadon and Azrael, his most loyal lieutenants, stood down, an act that was soon followed by many others. They betrayed Lucifer and turned to Michael, but it was too late to save themselves. Banished from Heaven, the angels awoke on Earth as immortals, cursed to survive on human blood and to live forever through cycles of reincarnation.

Gabrielle chose to descend to Earth out of love for them, and was joined by her heavenly twin Michael, who could not bear to live without her by his side. They were called the Uncorrupted, as they were not vampires by sin, but by choice. Together, Michael and Gabrielle created the Code of the Vampires, the rules that they would all follow through the centuries to bring peace and beauty to the world, with the hope to one day be forgiven and be allowed to return to Paradise.

=== Silver Bloods ===
Fallen angels who have remained loyal to Lucifer and have no desire to return to Heaven or to follow the Code, Silver Bloods each have the strength of a thousand vampires. Instead of feeding on humans, they fed on their fellow vampires—the Blue Bloods—consuming their souls and memories; this act led to a life of turmoil and misery, and turned their blood silver. This causes them to appear schizophrenic. In past centuries, they had been enslaved by the Blue Bloods on Earth, until they rose up and fought against them in a ruthless massacre. Michael declared war against Lucifer and his followers, eventually banishing Lucifer into Hell, securing him behind 7 impenetrable gates. The Blue Bloods continued to live their lives safely, but rumors of the Silver Bloods' return continued to circulate every hundred years or so.

=== Half Bloods ===
Half Bloods are the product of one Blue Blood parent and one Red Blood (human) parent. They harbor the same powers as Blue Bloods and can also take human familiars. Only one Half Blood has ever been born: Schuyler Van Alen. Her parents were Allegra Van Alen Chase, a Blue Blood, and Stephen Chase, a Red Blood.

== Summaries ==
=== Blue Bloods ===
Publication Date: March 27, 2006

Schuyler Van Alen never fit in at Duchesne, her private school, preferring second-hand clothes to designer labels, and living in a old mansion with her grandmother, Cordelia, the only family she has. While most find her unusual, she is content with her life and her two friends, Oliver Hazard-Perry and Dylan Ward.

But when Schuyler turns fifteen, her life suddenly begins to change. Aggie Carondolet, a Duchesne classmate and close friend to Schuyler's nemesis, Mimi Force, is found dead in one of the city's nightclubs, she notices mysterious, intricate blue veins pulsing from her arms, and Jack Force, a dashing and popular boy who happens to be Mimi's twin brother, begins to take a sudden interest in her.

She receives a letter telling her that she has been accepted into "The Committee", and although she's not sure she wants to attend, she agrees due to the insistence of her grandmother. When she arrives, she finds that she has more in common with her classmates than she thought. She is a Blue Blood—a vampire. A society of powerful and influential Americans whose ancestors can be traced back for centuries. Schuyler and Oliver, whom she learns is her human Conduit, are suddenly thrown into a race to find the answers to the questions that she, and everyone else is asking. Have their ancient enemies, the Silver Bloods—vampires who prey on vampires—suddenly returned after having thought to be vanquished? Is the incriminatory circumstance of Schuyler's birth that broke the most sacred code of vampires the reason why her mother has been trapped in a coma for so many years?

After a tragic attack involving Cordelia, Schuyler soon finds that she herself is in danger, and that she has a long journey ahead of her that will take her to every corner of the world.

=== Masquerade ===
Publication Date: May 1, 2007

Schuyler and Oliver have traveled to Venice, Italy, in search of her grandfather, Lawrence Van Alen, who is said to have the answers she is looking for to solve the mysteries of the Silver Bloods. When they meet him, Lawrence doesn't believe that he can help them, and they dejectedly return to New York. As they return, the Blue Blood community is preparing for the annual Four Hundred Ball, the grandest event in all of New York City. Schuyler attends the ball with the hopes of seeing Jack Force, her forbidden crush, but he barely acknowledges her. After the ball, however, Schuyler receives an invite to a secret Blue Blood masquerade ball, covertly organized by Mimi Force. Schuyler attends, again with the hope of seeing Jack. When she is kissed at the party by a mysterious masked vampire, she presumes that it is Jack, only to later suspect it was someone else. Bliss Llewellyn meets a masked gentleman, hoping that he is Dylan Ward, who had disappeared during the speculated return of the Silver Bloods.

When Schuyler returns home, she is thrilled to find that Lawrence has returned to New York. He hires help to restore the dilapidated mansion to its original glory, while starting Schuyler's training to hone her vampire skills. The lives of the young vampires continue to become more mysterious, with Bliss experiencing recurrent blackouts, visions of a man in a white suit, and a menacing voice that only she can hear, while Schuyler is growing weaker as her mixed blood complicates her transformation from human to vampire. When Lawrence learns that Schuyler needs to take a human familiar in order to stabilize her transformation, an act that is not allowed until the vampire has turned eighteen, he suggests that she choose Oliver.

Meanwhile, Mimi Force, teamed up with Kingsley Martin, the mysterious and striking new Duchesne student, is conjuring a plan to be rid of Schuyler, whose budding relationship with Jack is putting Mimi and Jack's sacred bond at stake. Her plan turns into a disaster that puts countless others in danger, and her blood legacy into question, forcing a blood trial. Could the allegations against Mimi possibly be true? And what will the shocking return of a tortured vampire say about where Schuyler's allegiance lies?

=== Shelter Island (short story) ===
Publication Date: September 1, 2007

A girl named Hannah lives peacefully in her home on Shelter Island. One night she's visited by a boy who later introduces his name as Dylan Ward. He is a vampire whose family used to live in Hannah's home. Dylan is trying to elude another vampire who wishes to kill him, but he cannot succeed without blood. After several nights, Hannah finally agrees to aid him, and he is able to leave the house.

=== Revelations ===
Publication Date: October 31, 2008

As the controversy rises due to Dylan's stunning allegation against Schuyler, she has moved into the Force household with Charles Force, the Regis of the vampire Coven and her mother's former bondmate, his wife Trinity, and Mimi and Jack, after Charles's adoption petition was accepted. Charles forbids Schuyler to have any contact with her grandfather or her best friend, Oliver. No one is aware that both Jack and Schuyler have been having secret romantic meetings in one of his family's apartments until Mimi's suspicions drive her to follow them. Knowing that her heavenly bond with Jack is being put at risk, she aims to make life miserable for Schuyler, as well as keenly planning her ceremony with Jack in the hopes that she can still save their bond. Schuyler and Jack begin to contemplate the outcome if he were to forsake his bond and stay with Schuyler. Schuyler knows that because she has now taken Oliver as her human familiar, he is forever devoted to her, and whichever choice she makes will have consequences.

Bliss does not tell anyone about seeing Dylan, who has returned ragged and almost sickly, as she is still torn between her love for him and her fear of what the conclave would do to him if they knew. But when he suddenly attacks Schuyler—an act that doesn't seem to be of his own accord—Bliss decides to tell her father, who admits Dylan into a therapy center for Blue Bloods. In the meantime, Jordan Llewellyn, Bliss's younger half-sister, has been behaving differently and is caught in an attempt to murder her sister. Bliss had always been treated as the favorite child, with Jordan often pushed to the background, even by her own mother, BobiAnne. As the secrets of the Llewellyn family begin to unravel, Bliss discovers Jordan's identity as Sophia the Watcher, a Blue Blood born fully aware of her identity and abilities, forcefully called into the cycle by Cordelia Van Alen to defeat Lucifer and his allies.

After Kingsley's true identity as a Venator is revealed, she, as a new member of the Conclave, is intent on finding out what is happening to the Blue Bloods in different areas of the world, as Silver Bloods appear to be a growing threat.

Lawrence Van Alen, the newly appointed Regis of the Coven, must go to Rio de Janeiro to find out who is responsible for the Silver Blood menace, leaving Schuyler alone in New York. While he is gone, she communicates telepathically with him, but it brings her no peace. When more members of the Conclave travel to Rio, both Oliver and Schuyler, who is said to be the key to defeating the Silver Bloods, secretly follow them. But once the Conclave arrives for a gathering, a mass attack against them takes place that further endangers the future of the Blue Bloods. The majority of the conclave members slaughtered, it is discovered that Nan Cutler, the Regent of the Coven was a Silver Blood traitor all along. Lawrence, Schuyler and Oliver raced to the Statue of the Redeemer which is the location of Corcovado, the prison which holds Leviathan, Lucifer's brother, to try to stop him from being freed but when they arrived they realized it was too late. They were soon attacked by Lucifer himself when they reached the top of the mountain and in their battle, Lawrence was stabbed with a poisoned sword, destroying any possibility of future reincarnations. The battle is bloody, and when the violence ends in a heart-breaking outcome, Schuyler is once again in danger.

=== The Van Alen Legacy ===
Publication Date: October 6, 2009

Each chapter of The Van Alen Legacy alternates between the story progressions of Schuyler, Mimi, and Bliss.

More than a year has passed since the battle in Rio de Janeiro. Oliver and Schuyler have run away; her very life and future are in danger as she is unfairly blamed for her grandfather's tragic death. Complying with Lawrence's last words, Schuyler tries to find Charles Force in order to discover what is said to be the ‘Van Alen Legacy'. Their travels soon take them to Paris, where they attend a party thrown by the European Conclave. There, Schuyler unexpectedly finds Jack, who has come to warn her that Leviathan, the Silver Blood responsible for Lawrence's death, is hunting her. He tries to convince Schuyler to come home to no avail, but when her physical health continues to deteriorate, she agrees and returns to New York with Oliver.

Mimi has become a Venator, and has chosen to be a part of the team that is searching for Jordan Llewellyn, whose heavenly identity as ‘Sophia, the Watcher' has been revealed. She travels with the Lennox twins, and with Kingsley Martin, whom she begins to discover she has a deeper connection with than previously thought. When their journey takes them back to Rio, they finally discover Jordan, except they find that her body has been abandoned and that Sophia has taken on a new living form. She returns to New York City for her senior year, and despite her feelings for Kingsley, she continues to make sure that her imminent bonding ritual with Jack draws ever near.

After returning home, Schuyler learns that her mother, Allegra, has finally awoken, and she rushes to the hospital to see her. When Allegra informs her daughter of The Van Alen Legacy, Schuyler must inform the seven gatekeepers that Lucifer and Leviathan are plotting to open the Gates of Hell so they may be released onto Earth. Allegra claims that she now must find Charles Force, who was last seen battling Leviathan in an underground labyrinth.

Bliss's life has undoubtedly changed—possibly for the worse. She has learned the stunning secret of her origin. She is the daughter of Allegra Van Alen from a previous cycle by Lucifer himself, who has been using her body to speak to her—a voice she refers to as ‘the Visitor'—and to control her. Living in fear of Lucifer's demand to kill Schuyler, she avoids contact with her friends until the time of Jack and Mimi's bonding ceremony, of which she is one of Mimi's ‘bondsmaids'. Before the ceremony, she discovers that a small piece of glass hidden in her bouquet is the sword of Michael, the same sword that Jordan had used in her attempt to stab her. The bonding ceremony, however, goes terribly wrong, and Lucifer himself appears. Realizing that the only way to rid herself of her, father, Lucifer himself, Bliss takes the piece of glass which is Michael's sword and stabs herself in the heart. His presence forces Jack, Schuyler, Mimi, and Kingsley into the glom: an alternative netherworld in the universe that vampires can access. The only one that does not make it out of the glom is Kingsley, who becomes trapped in the underworld.

=== Misguided Angel ===
Publication Date: October 26, 2010

After saying farewell to Oliver in New York, Schuyler has traveled to Florence, Italy with her true love, Jack Force, with the hopes of protecting the remaining five Gates of Hell from Lucifer. Isabella of Orleans has offered them protection as they pursue their mission, but they quickly realize that Isabella's offer is more like imprisonment than protection, and they devise a plan to escape and continue their quest to locate the Gates of Hell. They find themselves in danger and on the run from Isabella's minions, soon discovering that they are under surveillance by the European Conclave.

Mimi Force has been elected as the new Regent of the crumbling Coven, which, thanks to an internet video release of the teen vampires at a party, is at risk of being exposed to the Red Bloods (humans). She is heartbroken over losing Kingsley, who is trapped in Hell, and faces immense rage and embarrassment over Jack's decision to forsake their bond to be with the half-blood, Schuyler Van Alen. Meanwhile, she has begun working with Oliver—an unlikely situation due to their rocky relationship—and the Lennox twins in order to find a missing teenage vampire who has been kidnapped and threatened with being burned alive. The Conclave covers up the secrets of the video by making the public believe that it is a new movie trailer, and assign certain members to work on production. This provides a cover-up, but does not fix the real problem at hand—someone knows far too much about them, and has every intention of using it against them. Help with the kidnapping soon comes from a Chinese Venator named Deming Chen, who must solve the mystery of the kidnapping before one of their own is destroyed. She is quickly thrown into untangling a web of lies and secrets regarding the kidnapping, facing an unforeseen twist when she thought she had all the answers, yet ultimately finding who is responsible for threatening their world, and why.

Mimi learns that Jack has been found by the Venators that she had sent to look for him, but he refuses to turn himself in. While she is pleased that her brother is ready to face his fate, she is also planning to travel to Hell to rescue Kingsley, with Oliver by her side.

=== Lost In Time ===
Publication Date: September 27, 2011

Each chapter in Lost In Time alternates between the stories of Schuyler and Jack, Mimi and Kingsley, and the past relationship of Allegra and Ben.

Jack and Schuyler have traveled to Egypt in an attempt to find a solution to the impending blood trial, the confrontation between Jack and Mimi in which only one can survive. The two of them search Alexandria for one of the gates along with its gatekeeper, Catherine of Siena. They hope to find a way to keep Jack from facing Mimi's wrath, and to save the Blue Bloods. After they are kidnapped by none other than Deming Chen and the Lennox twins, Sam and Ted, they learn that Red Blood women are being taken in order to birth 'Nephilim' by the Silver Bloods to be used in Lucifer's fight to regain access back into Heaven.

Mimi still has every intention of making Jack pay for breaking their bond, but she first wants to rescue Kingsley Martin. She and Oliver go on a mission to travel to Hell to find him, but Mimi knows that she has to make a trade—a soul for a soul—if she wants to free her true love, and secretly takes advantage of Oliver's presence. When they find Kingsley, she is shocked to find that he appears to be content living in Hell and appears to have lost all interest in her, much to her dismay. It is only when Kingsley learns of Mimi's true reason for traveling to Hell, that he realizes the misunderstanding and reveals his true feelings to her.

Allegra Van Alen has developed deep feelings for Ben, but forces herself to attempt to stay away from him before it progresses too far. She knows that she is the true bondmate of Charles Van Alen, and the two of them are meant to be together. Charles knows what is happening between the two of them and tries to keep Allegra on the right path and protect her from making a dire mistake, but she cannot help but be drawn to Ben. Even though she is plagued with visions of her lying unconscious in a hospital bed as a result of her temptations, she cannot turn her back on love.

Jack finally confronts Mimi to face his fate, but he has learned what they must do in order to permanently break their bond so neither of them will have to perish, and they ultimately make a very dark decision to once again give their loyalty to Lucifer.

=== Gates of Paradise ===
Publication Date: January 15, 2013

Gates of Paradise tells the stories of Mimi, Schuyler and Bliss in their final struggle against Lucifer. Mimi and Jack Force are tasked by Lucifer to kill their loves, Kingsley and Schuyler respectively. Schuyler is preparing to storm the gates of hell to defeat Lucifer. Bliss with the help of Lawson work to free the Hounds of Hell from their imprisonment. Jack and Mimi have agreed to deceive Lucifer into believing they were loyal to him once again. Jack's deception was made more believable by draining some of Schuyler's blood. This was actually to Schuyler's aid, and allowed her to open the Gate of Paradise, killing Jack, and defeating Lucifer in the process.

After their redemption the Blue Bloods were allowed access back into Heaven. Many chose to through the gates while some stayed on Earth to finish their cycle. Michael and Gabrielle; Charles Force and Allegra Van Alen Chase respectively, chose to return to heaven immediately. Schuyler learned that her father; Ben Chase, had another daughter. Schuyler is able to meet her half-sister and paternal grandmother. Oliver ends up falling in love with Schuyler's half-sister and proceeds to ask Heaven to turn him into a Blue Blood. Several years after the final battle while Schuyler is attending college she runs into Jack who has been brought back to life and returned to Earth for his part in the destruction of Lucifer.

=== Keys to the Repository (companion novel) ===
Publication Date: June 29, 2010

This book is a "companion novel" and not a part of the story told in the seven-book series. This book is structured as a set of files from the Repository of History, a Blue Blood establishment below the streets of New York City. These files contain detailed descriptions and information on the characters in the series. It contains short stories involving the secret meetings between Schuyler and Jack, and Mimi and Kingsley, as well as what happened to Dylan during the time he was missing. It also includes journal entries, personal letters, and a sneak peek into the spin-off series Wolf Pact, in which Bliss Llewellyn is the central character.

=== Bloody Valentine (novella) ===
Publication Date: December 28, 2010

Bloody Valentine is a Blue Bloods novella and not a part of the story told in the seven-book series. It contains three stories centered around love and passion.

The first is about Schuyler's best friend Oliver Hazard-Perry, and Freya Beauchamp, a bartender and the center of another Blue Bloods spin-off series entitled Witches of East End. It tells the story of what Oliver was going through during the events in the previous book.

The second story dates back to 1985, when Allegra Van Alen, Schuyler's mother, was attending Endicott Academy with Charles Force, where she fell in love with her human familiar Steven Chase, better known as "Ben".

The final story centers around Jack and Schuyler and tells the story of their bonding ceremony.

=== Wolf Pact (Companion series) ===
Publication Date: April 1, 2012

Wolf Pact is a spin-off to the Blue Bloods series. It consists of four books which tell the story of Bliss Llewellyn after Jack and Schuyler's bonding ceremony, in which she is no longer a vampire and must seek help from the "Hellhounds" in order to help defeat the Silver Bloods.

== Glossary ==
Blade of Justice Michael's sword. It is one of two, the other belonging to Gabrielle. Only an archangel's sword can kill an archangel.

Blood Bond The immortal bond between two vampires whose souls were twinned in Heaven. Bondmates must renew their sacred bond during each cycle with a ceremony, normally happening at twenty-one years of age after they have come into their full powers and memories of their past lives. The two vampires become stronger after the bond has been renewed, but if it is broken, the betrayed vampire may call a blood trial, which will ultimately lead to the other's death. Not every vampire has a bond with another.

Blood Manifest (Transformation) When a Blue Blood vampire's DNA begins to take over, usually around the age of fifteen. Their fangs grow in, their body switches from needing food to needing human blood, and the memories of their past lives begin to return. The process usually has an intense effect on the vampire, making them weak and sick.

Blood Trial How serious offenses against The Code are resolved. It requires the blood of the offending party to be consumed in order to tell truth from lie. In the past, only Gabrielle (Allegra) could perform the trial, but Schuyler has inherited her mother's ability. The punishment for vampires found guilty is being burned to death.

The Code of the Vampires (the Code, the Blue Bloods Code) A strict set of rules that the Blue Bloods follow with the hope that it will eventually lead them back to Paradise. It states that Red Bloods (humans) are not to be dominated, but respected, so that the Blue Bloods will bring peace to the world.

The Conclave The coven's highest leadership. They are responsible for making decisions for the future of the vampire race.

Conduit A human who is assigned to a Blue Blood at birth to be their associate and caretaker to help him/her navigate the human world. Many Conduit families will serve their Blue Blood families for centuries as their lawyers, doctors, accountants, and friends. If a vampire expires, their Conduit will have a choice to either work in the Repository or have their memories erased.

Coven A group of vampires living in a geographic area.

The Cycle The length of a human life. When Blue Bloods are reincarnated, their body lives for one cycle then dies like any other human body, but their DNA and memories are kept safe until they are called upon again. When they are called, their DNA is placed inside a female Blue Blood using IVF. They are then born and live as normal humans until the Sunset Years.

Duchesne (Doo-SHEN) The prestigious private school in Manhattan attended by Blue Bloods. The school also educates Human Conduits, as well as Red Bloods who are there on scholarship, some of whom serve as Human Familiars.

Enmortals Vampires who do not rest and reincarnate between cycles, and keep the same physical form over many centuries. They do not require the proximity of other vampires in order to survive.

The Gates of Hell Seven gates created by the Order of the Seven (the gatekeepers) to keep Lucifer and the Silver Bloods trapped in the underworld.

The Glom It is described as two separate things: one is the line of consciousness that the vampires use to communicate telepathically with one another, or to control the mind of a human. The second is described as the twilight netherworld that vampires can access.

Human Familiar The humans that the Blue Bloods feed on. The Code requires vampires to never abuse them or fully drain them, and to treat them with care for the service they provide. Once a familiar is taken, they will forever feel a bond with their vampire.

Nephilim Half-human, half-Silver Blood.

Red Bloods Humans.

Regent The second-highest-ranking member of the Conclave. They assume responsibility for the Coven if the Regis is unable to.

Regis The leader of the Coven and Conclave. The Regis is chosen unanimously by the seven Wardens who represent the ruling houses.

The Sunset Years The name given to the years between the ages of 15 and 21. During the Sunset Years, Blue Bloods start to turn into fully-fledged vampires, remembering past lives and discovering their abilities. Vampires are most vulnerable during these years.

The Repository of History The headquarters of the Committee and all of the Blue Bloods' archives. It contains all of their knowledge and secrets.

Venator (Truth Seeker, Truth Teller) The highest rank of the Committee's secret police. Their role is to keep the Blue Bloods safe. They are capable of deciphering dreams and can access the memories of both humans and vampires.

== Spin-off series ==
- Witches of East End is the first book in a spin-off series that takes place in the fictional town of North Hampton, and is centered around the Beauchamp family, including Freya Beauchamp, a sexy bartender whom Oliver meets in Bloody Valentine. The series so far contains three books; Serpent's Kiss and Winds of Salem are the sequel to Witches of East End.

== Screen Adaptations ==
Walt Disney Pictures acquired the film rights to make the series into a film franchise. Producers have not yet announced who will direct the movie.

Deadline reported in July 2024 that Awesomness was developing a TV adaptation.

== Critical reception ==
"De la Cruz introduces a conception of vampires far different from stake-fleeing demons in traditional horror fiction, coupling sly humor with gauzier trappings of being fanged and fabulous." —Booklist (starred review)

"The intriguing plot will keep teens reading." —School Library Journal

"Juicy voyeuristic peek into the lives of rich Manhattanites—who happen to be vampires." —Kirkus Reviews
