= Tom Dolby =

American novelist

- Born: January 17, 1975 (age 51); London, England
- Education: Hotchkiss School; Yale University
- Occupations: Filmmaker; producer; novelist
- Spouse: Andrew Frist (m. 2009; div. 2015)
- Children: 2
- Parent(s): Ray Dolby; Dagmar Dolby

Tom Dolby (born January 17, 1975) is an American filmmaker, producer, and novelist. Dolby was the writer and co-director of the feature film Last Weekend. He was also the director and co-writer of the film The Artist's Wife. Dolby is the principal and founder of Water's End Productions, a Los Angeles–based production company that has produced films such as Luca Guadagnino's Call Me By Your Name, Ira Sachs' Little Men, Matt Tyrnauer's Scotty and the Secret History of Hollywood, and Nia DaCosta's Little Woods.

== Early life and education ==
Tom Dolby was born on January 17, 1975, in London, England. He grew up in San Francisco, California. He is the son of American businessman and engineer Ray Dolby and NARAL Pro-Choice America activist and fundraiser Dagmar Dolby. He graduated from the Hotchkiss School in 1994 and Yale University in 1998.

== Career ==
Tom Dolby's debut novel, The Trouble Boy, concerns a young gay screenwriter in Manhattan. It was followed by the boarding school novel The Sixth Form (2008), set at an elite Massachusetts prep school. Dolby's first young adult novel, Secret Society, was published by Katherine Tegen Books at HarperCollins in October 2009. Its followup, The Trust: A Secret Society Novel, was released in February 2011.

He was also the co-editor, with the novelist Melissa de la Cruz, of the personal essay anthology Girls Who Like Boys Who Like Boys: True Tales of Love, Lust, and Friendship Between Straight Women and Gay Men (2007), featuring works by Armistead Maupin, Ayelet Waldman, Andrew Solomon, Cindy Chupack, Simon Doonan, Gigi Levangie Grazer, David Ebershoff, and others. A reality television show inspired by the anthology, entitled Girls Who Like Boys Who Like Boys was produced by World of Wonder and aired on the Sundance Channel in 2010 and 2011. Dolby and de la Cruz served as Consulting Producers.

In 2012, Dolby wrote and co-directed the film Last Weekend, starring Patricia Clarkson, Zachary Booth, Joseph Cross, Rutina Wesley, Fran Kranz, Jayma Mays, Chris Mulkey, Judith Light, and Mary Kay Place. The film was produced by Mark Johnson and Mike S. Ryan, and was released by IFC/Sundance Selects in 2014.

In 2013, Dolby began investing in and developing a slate of film and television projects through his production company, Water's End Productions. Water's End Productions has produced such films as Ira Sachs' Little Men and Luca Guadagnino's Call Me By Your Name.

In January 2018, Dolby and Water's End Productions, in association with Greyshack Films, began principal photography in New York City and the Hamptons on the independent feature film The Artist's Wife, starring Lena Olin, Bruce Dern, Avan Jogia, Juliet Rylance, and Stefanie Powers. The film premiered at the 2019 Hamptons International Film Festival. It was scheduled to release in the United States on April 3, 2020, but was postponed to September 25, 2020, due to the COVID-19 pandemic.
