= Novosibirsk Precision Engineering Plant =

- Founded: 1941
- Headquarters: Novosibirsk, Russia
- Products: explosive devices, audio recorders, video tape recorders etc.

Novosibirsk Precision Engineering Plant (Russian: Новосибирский завод точного машиностроения), also known as NZTM, Tochmash and Kometa, was a plant which operated in Dzerzhinsky District of Novosibirsk, Russia. It was founded in 1941.

== History ==
The plant was founded on the basis of evacuated Taganrog Plant No. 65 and Lyubertsy Plant No. 512 in 1941. At that time, the enterprise began to produce explosive devices.

In December 1941, the plant produced 150 A-7 radio stations, 100 000 shell casings for 20-mm airborne fragmentation-incendiary projectiles and 10 000 K-6 fuses.

After the Second World War, the plant began to produce new complicated types of explosive equipment.

In 1961, the plant begins production of missile weapons, radar devices for missiles (for example, for anti-aircraft missile systems), etc.

On July 1, 1961, the USSR Council of Ministers issued a decree according to which the Tochmash began production of video tape recorders for recording of television broadcasts, initially these devices recorded only black-and-white programs, but later the plant began to produce video tape recorders for recording of TV broadcasts in color.

For video recording of the 1980 Summer Olympic Games, the plant equipped the Ostankino Television Center with video recorders. These video recorders were also supplied to the CMEA countries.

In the 1990s, the plant produced welding machines, electric motors, medical equipment, etc.

== Awards ==
In 1971, the plant was awarded the Order of the Badge of Honor for the development of the production of television equipment.

== Bibliography ==
- Ламин В. А. (2003). Энциклопедия. Новосибирск. Новосибирск: Новосибирское книжное издательство. p. 429. ISBN 5-7620-0968-8.
