= Dagmar Dolby =

American philanthropist (born 1941)

- Born: Dagmar Bäumert; 1941 (age 84–85); Germany
- Education: Heidelberg University, Cambridge University
- Spouse: Ray Dolby (m. 1966; died 2013)
- Children: 2, including Tom Dolby

Dagmar Dolby (born 1941) is an American philanthropist billionaire with an estimated net worth of $5.1 billion as of January 2025. The source of her wealth comes from Dolby Laboratories, founded by her late husband Ray Dolby.

== Early life ==
Dolby was born in Germany in 1941 as Dagmar Bäumert. She grew up in Frankfurt, Germany.

She met her future husband Ray Dolby in 1962 while she was living in Cambridge, England, and he was a Marshall Scholar at Cambridge University studying physics. They traveled to India, where Ray served as an advisor to the United Nations for two years before they returned to Great Britain by car. In 1965 in London, Ray founded Dolby Laboratories, which would go on to pioneer noise reduction and surround sound technology and serve as the source of the Dolby family's wealth.

== Philanthropy ==
In 1976, Dagmar Dolby and her family moved to San Francisco, California, the new headquarters of her husband's company, Dolby Laboratories. She became a fixture of the city's social scene and focused on philanthropy.

Ray Dolby was diagnosed with Alzheimer's disease around 2009, which precipitated Dagmar's involvement in Alzheimer's research and advocacy. The Dolby family donated $21 million to the California Pacific Medical Center in 2011, though the donation wasn't announced until 2014. They also gave $16 million in 2006 and $20 million in 2011 to build the Ray and Dagmar Dolby Regeneration Medicine Building for stem cell research at the University of California-San Francisco.

When Ray Dolby died of leukemia in 2013, Dagmar assumed ownership of nearly 36 percent of Dolby Laboratories.

She donated $52.6 million to Cambridge University in 2015 to fund construction of the Ray and Dagmar Dolby Court, a student living area. In 2017, Dagmar became a signatory of The Giving Pledge, with a focus on reproductive rights, stem cell research, and research on mood disorders and Alzheimer's disease.

In 2024, Dolby was appointed an Honorary Dame Commander of the Order of the British Empire for her services to philanthropy and British higher education.

== Personal life ==
Dagmar and Ray married in 1966. The couple had two sons. She lives in the Pacific Heights neighborhood of San Francisco, and has four granddaughters.
