= Melissa de la Cruz =

American writer

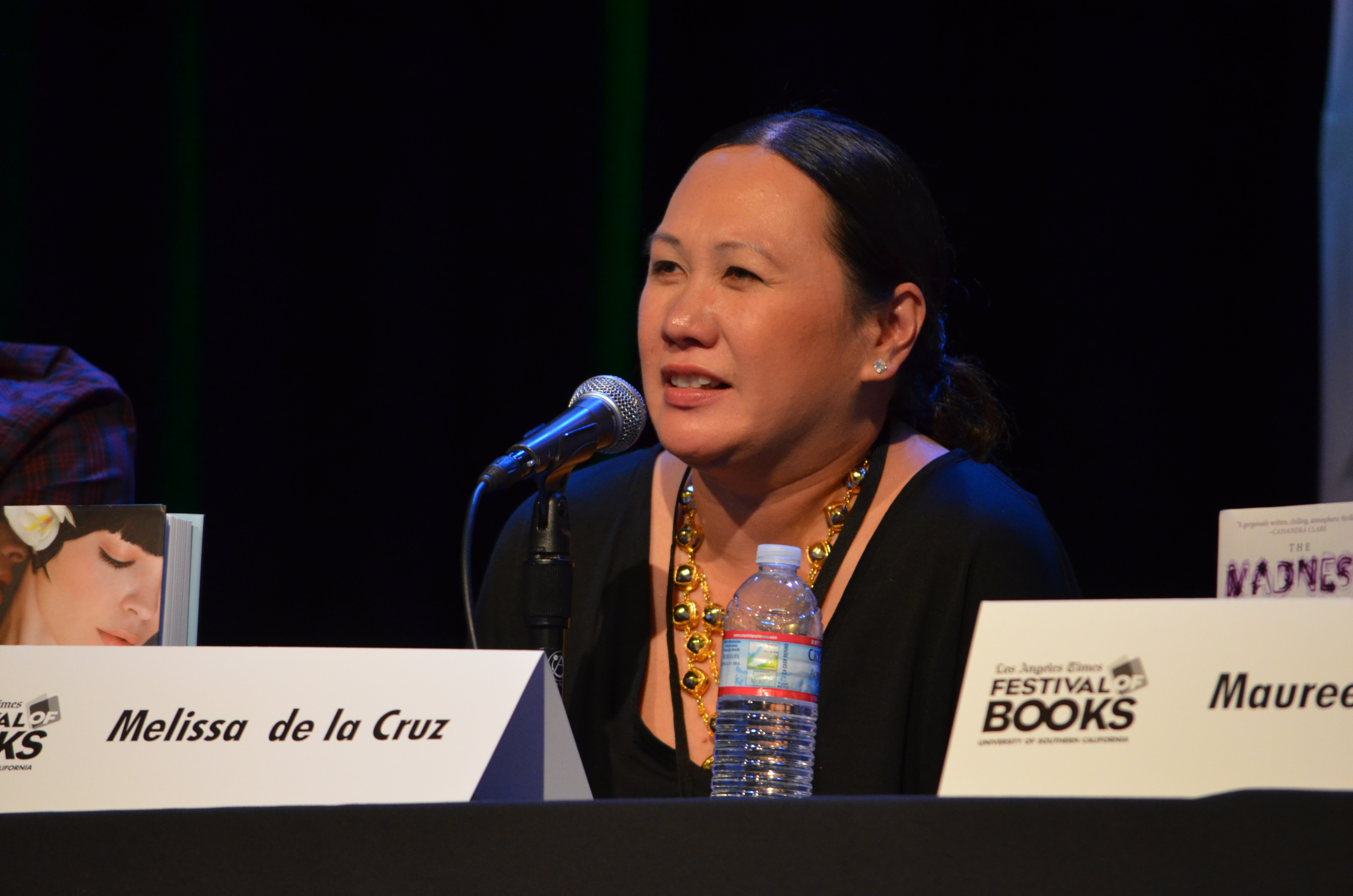
- At the 2013 LATimes Festival of Books
- Born: September 7, 1971 (age 55); Manila, Philippines
- Education: Columbia University
- Occupation: Writer
- Spouse: Michael Johnston
- Children: 1
- Writing career
- Language: English
- Years active: 1996–present
- Genre: Young adult fiction
- Notable works: Blue Bloods, Witches of East End
- Website: melissa-delacruz.com

Melissa de la Cruz (born September 7, 1971) is a Filipina-American writer known for young adult fiction. Her young-adult series include Au Pairs, Blue Bloods, and The Beauchamp Family.

== Early life and education ==
Melissa de la Cruz was born in Manila, Philippines. She has wanted to be an author since she was eleven years old.

She immigrated to the United States with her family in 1985 when she was 13 and they settled in San Francisco, where she graduated from Convent of the Sacred Heart High School. She studied art history and English at Columbia University in New York City. After graduation she worked as a computer consultant.

== Career ==
De la Cruz wrote her first full-length novel at 22 while living in New York City and working at Bankers Trust. That novel did not sell, but an editor at Little, Brown and Company suggested she become a journalist to work on her professional writing credits. She started working freelance and published her first essay in New York Press in 1996. She also worked as a beauty and fashion editor until she sold her debut novel, The Cat's Meow, in 1998. De la Cruz has published articles in The New York Times, Cosmopolitan, Seventeen, Teen Vogue, and Harper's Magazine. After publication of her debut novel in 2001, and layoff from her job at Morgan Stanley, she pursued writing full-time.

Work as a fashion writer for Marie Claire was the inspiration for How to Become Famous in Two Weeks or Less (2003) by de la Cruz and Karen Robinovitz. Work as a nanny and visits to The Hamptons formed the background for her 2004 to 2007 series The Au Pairs. De la Cruz has also written original novels for Disney's Descendants franchise, with the first published in 2015.

On February 3rd, 2026, De la Cruz published Sibylline, and it was recommended as part of the Good Morning America Book Club for Teens. De la Cruz received backlash for the book being marketed for teenagers, while containing a sexually explicit, non-consensual threesome between the three main characters, with readers describing it as necrophilia due to one character being considered dead by the others.

== Personal life ==
De la Cruz is married to Michael Johnston, another writer, with whom she co-wrote the Heart of Dread series. They and their daughter live in West Hollywood, California.

== Book series ==
- Au Pairs – about three girls working as au pairs in The Hamptons, started in 2004 with The Au Pairs
- Blue Bloods – vampire novel series, started in 2006 with Blue Bloods
- The Ashleys – featuring girls who attend an exclusive prep school, inaugurated 2008 with The Ashleys: There's a New Name in School
- The Beauchamp Family – featuring a family of witches in the Blue Bloods universe, inaugurated 2011 with Witches of East End; adapted as 2013–2014 television series Witches of East End
- Wolf Pact – spin-off from Blue Bloods, released September to December 2012 as four short ebooks
- Heart of Dread – co-written with her husband Michael Johnston, inaugurated 2013 with Frozen
- The Ring and the Crown – historical fiction about five young adults embroiled in love, politics, and magic during a London coming-of-age season
- Alex and Eliza – historical fiction following the 18th-century romance between American founding father Alexander Hamilton and his wife Elizabeth Schuyler, from 2017
- 29 – contemporary fiction featuring a South Korean teen and her path to finding love, from 2019
- Never After – inaugurated 2020 with The Thirteenth Fairy
- The Queen's Assassin – inaugurated 2020 with The Queen's Assassin

== Works ==
Au Pairs

1. The Au Pairs (2004)
2. Skinny Dipping (2005)
3. Sun-Kissed (2006)
4. Crazy Hot (2007)

The Ashleys

1. There's a New Name in School ... (2008)
2. Jealous? You Know You Are ... (2008)
3. Birthday Vicious (2008)
4. Lipgloss Jungle (2008)

Heart of Dread
De la Cruz and her husband Michael Johnston wrote the Heart of Dread trilogy together.

1. Frozen (2013)
2. Stolen (2014)
3. Golden (2016)

The Ring and the Crown

1. The Ring and the Crown (2014)
2. The Lily and the Cross (2017)

Disney Descendants
The Isle of the Lost novels are one series of print books in the Descendants franchise inaugurated by the 2015 Disney musical fantasy TV film Descendants

1. The Isle of the Lost (2015)
2. Return to the Isle of the Lost (2016)
3. Rise of the Isle of the Lost (2017)
4. Escape from the Isle of the Lost (2019)
5. Beyond the Isle of the Lost (2024)

Alex & Eliza

1. Alex and Eliza (2017)
2. Love & War (2018)
3. All for One (2019)

29

1. 29 Dates (2019)
2. 29 Boyfriends (2019)

Never After

1. The Thirteenth Fairy (2020)
2. The Stolen Slippers (2022)
3. "The Broken Mirror" (2022)
4. "The Missing Sword" (2023)

The Queen's Assassin

1. The Queen's Assassin (2020)
2. The Queen's Secret (2021)

Blue Bloods universe

Blue Bloods

1. Blue Bloods (2006)
2. Masquerade (2007)
3. Revelations (2008)
4. The Van Alen Legacy (2009)
5. Misguided Angel (2010)
6. Bloody Valentine (2010)
7. Lost in Time (2011)
8. Gates of Paradise (2013)

- Keys to the Repository (2010), "companion novel", or collection

The Beauchamp Family

1. Witches of East End (2011)
2. Serpent's Kiss (2012)
3. Winds of Salem (2013)
4. Triple Moon (2015)
5. Double Eclipse (2016)

Wolf Pact
Wolf Pact was first published October to December 2012 as four ebooks entitled Wolf Pact: Part One of Four and so on, followed by a paperback first edition of the whole.
- Wolf Pact (2012)

The New Blue Bloods Coven

1. Vampires of Manhattan (2014)
2. White Nights (2017)

Stand-alone novels

- Cat's Meow (2001)
- How to Become Famous in Two Weeks or Less (2003), by de la Cruz and Karen Robinovitz
- The Fashionista Files: Adventures in Four-Inch Heels and Faux Pas (2004)
- Fresh off the Boat (2005)
- Angels on Sunset Boulevard (2007)
- Girl Stays in the Picture (2009)
- Surviving High School: A Novel (2016)
- Something in Between (2016)
- Pride & Prejudice & Mistletoe (2017)
- Someone to Love (2018)
- Once Upon a River (2018)
- Gotham High (2020)
- Jo & Laurie (2020), by Melissa Stohl and de la Cruz
- High School Musical: The Musical: The Series: The Road Trip (2021)
- Cinder & Glass (2022)
- A Secret Princess (2022, expected June), by Melissa Stohl and de la Cruz
- Snow & Poison (2023)
- Going Dark (2023)
- The Five Stages of Courting Dalisay Ramos (2024)
- Sibylline (2026)

Short stories

- Mistletoe (2006) – anthology with de la Cruz a contributing author
- "Shelter Island", in 666: The Number of the Beast (2007), anthology
- 21 Proms (2007), anthology by de la Cruz
- "A Manhattan Love Story", in Girls Who Like Boys Who Like Boys (2007), anthology
- "Shelter Island", in The Eternal Kiss (2009), anthology
- "Code of Honor", in A Thousand Beginnings and Endings (2018), anthology, eds. Ellen Oh and Elsie Chapman
