= Sandra Stahl Dolby =

Sandra K. Dolby aka Sandra K. D. Stahl (born 1946) is a professor in Indiana University’s Department of Folklore and Ethnomusicology and the American Studies Program.

== Academics ==
Dolby earned her BA in English at Manchester College in 1969 and taught English at the high school level from 1969 to 1970.

Her love of stories, both literary and oral, led her to study Literary Folkloristics Folklore at Indiana University, where she obtained her MA and PhD in 1973 and 1975, respectively.

While at IU, Dolby served as an editorial assistant under Richard Dorson while working for the Indiana University Press.

After graduating IU with her doctorate, Sandra became an assistant professor in the English Department at the University of Houston in Texas. She returned to Indiana in 1979 as an assistant professor of Folklore, where she has since remained. She plans to retire after the spring semester of 2010 to write full-time.

Dolby is best known in her career as the pioneer of the Personal Experience Narrative, a genre in which one's stories make up their own personal folklore. This research began with her doctoral dissertation, in which she interviewed her mother for life stories. Dolby acknowledges that, today, interviewing within one's own family is frowned upon in academic circles. The project, however, helped her launch an innovative career in the field. Her 1989 book Literary Folkloristics and the Personal Narrative is a seminal work in the genre, gathering well over a decade's worth of research into one piece.

Dolby's articles on Personal Experience Narratives have appeared in such notable Journals as the Journal of Folklore Research, Western Folklore, and American Quarterly. She also has earned entries in multiple encyclopedias, including the Encyclopedia of American Studies and the Encyclopedia of Folklore and Literature.

Personal Experience Narratives and are not the only folkloristic innovations for Dolby. In 2005, she published her second book, Self-Help Books: Why Americans Keep Reading Them in which she explores the phenomenon of self-help texts and how their authors use folklore to influence the lives of their readers.

== Personal life ==
Sandra is currently working on a project involving George Frideric Handel, hoping to devote her full attention to it after her retirement. “I would call it a kind of creative nonfiction or perhaps fictional biography, but neither of those terms actually describe it,” Dolby says. The project, though not a classic “academic” piece, does reflect her training in folklore.

Along with folklore and literature, Sandra has always kept music a part of her life. As a guitar player and singer, Dolby made an album in 1969 called The First Time Ever. “I’ve made a few albums more recently, including one for my daughter’s wedding called Wedding Song.” One of her albums, When I Wanted Warm, is for sale on her website. Dolby is currently a member of the Bloomington Chamber Singers. When asked about her quirky hobbies, Sandra admits that “I started out wanting to be a scientist. I continue to take a Science News magazine, and much of my “fun” reading and documentary watching is in the sciences. At one time I thought about being a science writer, and I’ve often wondered what it would have been like to work with people like David Attenborough to create PBS documentaries.”

== Books ==
- Literary Folkloristics and the Personal Narrative (1989)
- Self-Help Books: Why Americans Keep Reading Them (2005)
- The Handel Letters: A Biographical Conversation (2017)
