= Charmed merchandise =

Products based on the Charmed television series

The American television series Charmed has generated a range of merchandise including soundtracks, DVD sets, blu-rays, novels, comic books, a magazine, video game, and board games.

== Soundtracks ==
Four soundtrack albums of Charmed have been released and feature music that was used in the show. The first soundtrack album, Charmed: The Soundtrack, was released as a worldwide digital partial edition on September 22, 2003, by BMG Music. The full edition was released as a CD in the United States on September 23, 2003, and in the United Kingdom on September 29, 2003. Charmed: The Soundtrack debuted at number 177 on the US Billboard 200 chart and number 10 on the US Billboard Top Soundtracks chart. The second soundtrack album, Charmed: The Book of Shadows, was released as a worldwide digital download on January 1, 2005, by Silva Screen Records. It was later released as a CD in the US on April 19, 2005, and in the UK on September 5, 2005. Charmed: The Book of Shadows debuted at number 9 on the US Billboard Top Soundtracks chart and number 20 on the US Billboard Top Independent Albums chart.

The third soundtrack album, Charmed: The Final Chapter, was released as a CD in the US on May 9, 2006, and in the UK on November 20, 2006. It was later released as a worldwide digital download on July 22, 2008, by Artists' Addiction Records. The fourth soundtrack, Charmed: Score from the Television Series, was released as a limited edition on June 18, 2013, by La-La Land Records. It featured a selection of cues from the show by composer J. Peter Robinson. The release was limited to 3000 units, with the first 100 units signed by Robinson himself.

== Home media ==
=== Season DVDs ===
All eight seasons of Charmed have been released on DVD in Regions 1, 2 and 4. The Complete First Season was released in Region 1 on February 1, 2005, and Region 2 on June 6, 2005. The Complete Second Season was released in Region 2 on August 1, 2005, and Region 1 on September 6, 2005. The Complete Third Season was released in Region 2 on October 3, 2005, and Region 1 on November 15, 2005. The Complete Fourth Season was released in Region 2 on November 21, 2005, and Region 1 on February 28, 2006. The Complete Fifth Season was released in Region 2 on March 6, 2006, and Region 1 on June 6, 2006. The Complete Sixth Season was released in Region 2 on April 3, 2006, and Region 1 on October 17, 2006. The Complete Seventh Season was released in Region 2 on June 5, 2006, and Region 1 on February 6, 2007. The DVDs of the first seven seasons of Charmed contain no special features.

The Complete Eighth Season was released in Region 2 on April 30, 2007, and Region 1 on September 11, 2007. Special features include "The Making of Charmed", "The Story of Charmed" (a two-part documentary), "To The Manor Born" (a behind-the-scenes look at the Halliwell Manor), and "Forever Charmed" (a profile of Charmed fans). The DVD also features a new opening theme, having replaced the original theme song "How Soon is Now?" with hard-rock instrumental music. This change was made because the music license to use "How Soon is Now?" had expired. A new packaging of the Region 4 DVDs for all eight seasons were released on April 7, 2011.

=== DVD box sets ===
The Book of Shadows DVD Collection was released as a limited edition in Region 4 on November 16, 2006. It included seasons 1–7 in a replica of the Book of Shadows used in Charmed, with an extra page reserved to place the separately released season eight DVD. The DVD's book included a selection of the original illustrated pages from the show's Book of Shadows. The Triquetra symbol on the front of the DVD's book contained eight flashing LED lights that would light up when the book moved.

The Magic Chest Box Set was released as a limited edition in Region 2 on March 5, 2007. It included all eight seasons and came in an ornate miniature wooden chest with leatherworks and a red velvet interior. The Ultimate Box Set was released in Region 2 on October 27, 2008, and Region 4 on November 6, 2008. The set includes all eight seasons, with a cover that features all four Halliwell sisters together. It also includes a bonus disc with special features such as the original unaired pilot, "The Demons of Charmed", "Charmed Effects", "The Men of Charmed", "The Book of Shadows", "The Power of Three", "Directing Charmed", and "The Making of a Monster".

Two of The Complete Series box sets were released in Region 1 on November 18, 2008. Both sets are a replica of the show's Book of Shadows, with one set being a regular release and the other being a limited deluxe edition. Both sets also include the special features from the season eight DVD and The Ultimate Box Set. The Complete Series was re-released in the United States on November 11, 2014. It was released in a new box, with a brand new cover of all four sisters. The set also includes the special features from the season eight DVD and a bonus special feature called "Easter Eggs".

=== Blu-ray ===
In June 2018, CBS Studios (who own the rights to Charmed) announced that the whole series was in the process of being remastered to high-definition with a completion date of September 2019. The remastered version of the first season was released on high-definition Blu-ray in the United States on October 30, 2018, and in the United Kingdom on November 12, 2018. A Blu-ray release for Season 2 has been confirmed, but will instead be released by the manufacture on-demand company Allied Vaughn. All remaining seasons were released over the course of the subsequent months, with the final season released in late 2021.

== Book series ==
=== Novels ===
The Charmed novels are a series of books that accompany the television series, but follow no strict continuity with the series or each other. The first novel, The Power of Three, was released in November 1999 and is a novelization of the series premiere episode "Something Wicca This Way Comes". All other novels, apart from Charmed Again which documents the events of the two-part episode of the same name, are original stories revolving around the four Charmed Ones and their allies. A total of forty-three novels were written. Ten include Prue and the original line-up of Charmed Ones, whilst the remaining thirty-three feature Piper, Phoebe and Paige. Two other novels, Seasons of the Witch and The Warren Witches, are anthologies of short stories. The final novel, Trickery Treat, was released in January 2008.

In 2015, HarperCollins acquired the rights to publish a second series of Charmed novels from CBS Consumer Products. The first novel, The War on Witches, was published in May 2015 and its narrative is set between the events of Seasons 9 and 10 of the comic book series. It is written by Ruditis, who previously authored Season 9 and edited Season 10, and follows the younger Charmed Ones' reunions with Prue and Cole Turner after their resurrections.

=== Comic books ===
The Charmed comic books serve as a continuation of the television series and were originally published by Zenescope Entertainment. The first comic book series, Charmed: Season 9, was released in June 2010 and is set eighteen months after the events of the televised show's final episode, "Forever Charmed." Author Paul Ruditis was the lead writer of the first series and Raven Gregory helped him co-write the first three issues. The second and final comic book series by Zenescope, Charmed: Season 10, debuted at the New York Comic Con during the weekend of October 9, 2014. Pat Shand was the lead writer of the second series while Ruditis assumed the role of editor. In 2017, Dynamite Entertainment acquired the rights to publish a new comic book series titled Charmed: A Thousand Deaths. It was written by Erica Schultz and illustrated by Maria Sanapo.

== Other merchandise ==
Several official board games of Charmed have been published by Clash of Arms and Tilsit. The show's first board game, Charmed: The Book of Shadows, was released in 2001 and the second board game, Charmed: The Source, was released in 2003. Other board games include Charmed: The Power of Three and Charmed: The Prophecy, both of which were released in 2005. An action, platform video game of Charmed was developed by DC Studios and published by In-Fusio. The game was released for mobile phones in Europe in 2003 and North America in 2004.

In 2004, Titan Magazines began publishing the Charmed Magazine, which was issued bi-monthly and featured interviews with the cast and crew, the latest news and developments, and behind-the-scenes information on the show. The 24th and final issue of Charmed Magazine was released in 2008.
