= List of awards and nominations received by Charmed =

Charmed
Awards and nominations
Award	Wins	Nominations
ASCAP Film and Television Music Awards	2	2
Cable Guide Awards	1	1
EDGE Awards	1	1
Family Television Awards	1	1
Hollywood Makeup Artist and Hair Stylist Guild Awards	0	1
Hollywood Post Alliance Awards	1	1
International Horror Guild Awards	0	2
NAACP Image Awards	0	1
Nickelodeon Kids' Choice Awards	0	1
RATTY Awards	1	7
Saturn Awards	0	3
Spacey Awards	0	1
Teen Choice Awards	0	3
Tubey Awards	1	1
TV Guide Awards	0	1
Wand Awards	0	3
Young Artist Awards	1	5

Totals (Note: Certain award groups do not simply award one winner. They acknowledge several different recipients, have runners-up, and have third place. Since this is a specific recognition and is different from losing an award, runner-up mentions are considered wins in this award tally. For simplification and to avoid errors, each award in this list has been presumed to have had a prior nomination.)
- Wins: 27
- Nominations: 54

Charmed is an American television series that was originally broadcast by The WB for eight seasons from October 7, 1998, until May 21, 2006. The series has earned various awards and nominations for its cast, crew and the series itself. Overall, Charmed has won 27 awards from 54 nominations.

== AOL TV ==
Year	Category	Nominee(s)	Result	Ref
2007	Top TV Witches	Piper Halliwell (Holly Marie Combs)	3rd	
2007	Top TV Witches	Phoebe Halliwell (Alyssa Milano)	7th	
2007	Top TV Witches	Prue Halliwell (Shannen Doherty)	9th	
2007	Top TV Witches	Paige Matthews (Rose McGowan)	12th	
2008	Top TV Witches	Piper Halliwell (Holly Marie Combs)	3rd	
2008	Top TV Witches	Phoebe Halliwell (Alyssa Milano)	7th	
2008	Top TV Witches	Prue Halliwell (Shannen Doherty)	10th	
2008	Top TV Witches	Paige Matthews (Rose McGowan)	13th	

== ASCAP Film and Television Music Awards ==
Year	Category	Nominee(s)	Result	Ref
1999	Top TV Series	Jay Gruska	Won	
1999	Top TV Series	Tim Truman	Won	

== Beliefnet ==
Year	Category	Nominee(s)	Result	Ref
2008	Top 10 Witches in Pop Culture	The Charmed Ones (Prue, Piper, Phoebe and Paige)	8th	

== Cable Guide Awards (UK) ==
Year	Category	Nominee(s)	Result	Ref
2001	Favourite Sci-Fi/Fantasy Series	Charmed	Won	

== Chicago Tribune ==
Year	Category	Nominee(s)	Result	Ref
2012	The Top Pop Culture Witches of All Time	The Charmed Ones (Piper, Phoebe and Paige)	7th	

== Cult TV (UK) ==
Year	Category	Nominee(s)	Result	Ref
2000	Top 100 Cult TV Shows	Charmed	44th	

=== Cult TV Festival Awards ===
Year	Category	Nominee(s)	Result	Ref
2003	Best Returning Satellite Series	Charmed	Nominated	

== E! Online ==
Year	Category	Nominee(s)	Result	Ref
2011	Top 10 Most Bitchin' Witches	Piper Halliwell (Holly Marie Combs)	6th	

== EDGE Awards ==
Year	Category	Nominee(s)	Result	Ref
2003	Certificate of Merit	Episode: "Muse to My Ears"	Won	

== Family Television Awards ==
Year	Category	Nominee(s)	Result	Ref
2005	Favorite Sister	Rose McGowan	Won	

== Golden Tater Awards ==
Year	Category	Nominee(s)	Result	Ref
2006	Show You'll Miss the Most	Charmed	5th	

== Hollywood Makeup Artist and Hair Stylist Guild Awards ==
Year	Category	Nominee(s)	Result	Ref
2000	Best Contemporary Hair Styling – Television	Kent Nelson and Suzanne Kontonickas (Episode: "The Devil's Music")	Nominated	

== Hollywood Post Alliance Awards ==
Year	Category	Nominee(s)	Result	Ref
2006	Outstanding Audio Post in Television	Greg Stacy; Mark Petersen; Mike Cook; Craig Dellinger; Jeff Clark	Won	

== HuffPost TV/AOL TV ==
Year	Category	Nominee(s)	Result	Ref
2010	The Top 20 Magic/Supernatural Shows of All Time	Charmed	10th	

== International Horror Guild Awards ==
Year	Category	Nominee(s)	Result	Ref
1998	Best Television Series	Charmed	Nominated	
2004	Best Television Series	Charmed	Nominated	

== NAACP Image Awards ==
Year	Category	Nominee(s)	Result	Ref
2006	Outstanding Directing in a Dramatic Series	Janice Cooke Leonard	Nominated	

== Nickelodeon Kids' Choice Awards ==
Year	Category	Nominee(s)	Result	Ref
2005	Favorite Television Actress	Alyssa Milano	Nominated	

== RATTY Awards ==
Year	Category	Nominee(s)	Result	Ref
1999	Best Science Fiction Directing	Episode: "Something Wicca This Way Comes"	Nominated	
2001	Outstanding Science Fiction Series	Charmed	Nominated	
2001	Outstanding Lead Actress in a Science Fiction Series	Holly Marie Combs	Nominated	
2001	Outstanding Ensemble in a Science Fiction Series	Charmed cast	Nominated	
2002	Best Science Fiction Lead Actress	Holly Marie Combs	Nominated	
2003	Best Science Fiction Lead Actress	Holly Marie Combs	Won	
2006	Worst Performer on Television	Kaley Cuoco	Nominated	

== Saturn Awards ==
Year	Category	Nominee(s)	Result	Ref
1999	Best Network Television Series	Charmed	Nominated	
1999	Best Actress on Television	Shannen Doherty	Nominated	
2000	Best Actress on Television	Shannen Doherty	Nominated	

== Seventeen magazine ==
Year	Category	Nominee(s)	Result	Ref
2011	Top 17 Fictional Witches of All Time	The Charmed Ones (Prue, Piper, Phoebe and Paige)	9th	

== Spacey Awards (Canada) ==
Year	Category	Nominee(s)	Result	Ref
2004	Favorite Female TV Character	Alyssa Milano	Nominated	

== Teen Choice Awards ==
Year	Category	Nominee(s)	Result	Ref
1999	Television – Choice Drama	Charmed	Nominated	
2000	Television – Choice Drama	Charmed	Nominated	
2006	Television – Choice Actress	Alyssa Milano	Nominated	

== Tubey Awards ==
Year	Category	Nominee(s)	Result	Ref
2006	The Jennifer North Memorial Citation For Pathetic Bleach-Blonde Bimbo Most In Need of a Fatal Overdose	Kaley Cuoco	Won	

== TV Guide ==
Year	Category	Nominee(s)	Result	Ref
2013	The 60 Greatest Sci-Fi Shows of All Time	Charmed	20th (Alphabetically)	

=== TV Guide Awards ===
Year	Category	Nominee(s)	Result	Ref
2000	Favorite Sci-Fi/Fantasy Show	Charmed	Nominated	

== Wand Awards ==
Year	Category	Nominee(s)	Result	Ref
2001	Best Fight	Alyssa Milano and Shannen Doherty	Nominated	
2001	Best Sobfest	Episode: "Just Harried"	Nominated	
2002	Best New Cast Member	Rose McGowan	Nominated	

== Wonderwall ==
Year	Category	Nominee(s)	Result	Ref
2014	Pop Culture's Favorite Witches	The Charmed Ones (Piper, Phoebe and Paige)	6th	

== Young Artist Awards ==
Year	Category	Nominee(s)	Result	Ref
2000	Best Performance in a TV Drama Series – Guest Starring Young Actor	Scott Terra	Nominated	
2001	Best Performance in a TV Drama Series – Guest Starring Young Actress	Rachel David	Nominated	
2002	Best Performance in a TV Drama Series – Guest Starring Young Actor	Bobby Edner	Nominated	
2003	Best Performance in a TV Drama Series – Guest Starring Young Actor	Alex Black	Won	
2003	Best Performance in a TV Comedy or Drama Series – Guest Starring Young Actress Age Ten or Younger	Samantha Goldstein	Nominated	
