= Ciardelli =

Ciardelli is an Italian surname. Notable people with the surname include:

- Andrea Reimann-Ciardelli (born 1956/57), American heiress
- Brooke Ciardelli, American theater and film director, producer and writer
