= Sweet Hearts Dance =

1988 film by Robert Greenwald

- Movie Poster
- Directed by: Robert Greenwald
- Written by: Ernest Thompson
- Produced by: Jeffrey Lurie
- Starring: Don Johnson; Susan Sarandon; Jeff Daniels; Elizabeth Perkins; Kate Reid; Justin Henry
- Cinematography: Tak Fujimoto
- Edited by: Robert Florio; Janet Bartels-Vandagriff
- Music by: Richard Gibbs
- Production company: ML Delphi Premier Productions
- Distributed by: Tri-Star Pictures
- Release date: September 23, 1988
- Running time: 101 minutes
- Country: United States
- Language: English
- Budget: $9 million
- Box office: $3,790,493

Sweet Hearts Dance is a 1988 American comedy drama film directed by Robert Greenwald. The screenplay by Ernest Thompson centers on two small town couples, one married for several years and the other at the beginning of their relationship.

The film was shot on location in Hyde Park, Vermont at Paul and Martha Mullins' house. The school gym built as a film set remained in use as Hyde Park Elementary School's gym until 2017.

== Plot ==
It's Halloween, and New England contractor Wiley Boon, married to his high school sweetheart Sandra and the father of three children, feels smothered after fifteen years of the same routine and is facing a midlife crisis. His best friend, local high school principal Sam Manners, is on the verge of starting a relationship with Adie Nims, a recent transplant from Florida and the new teacher at the grade school. During Thanksgiving dinner, Wiley and Sandra have a minor disagreement that prompts him to leave his family and move into a mobile home to sort through his feelings of emotional unrest. Using subsequent holidays as a background, the film focuses on both their efforts to recapture the magic of their early years together.

== Cast ==
- Don Johnson as Wiley Boon
- Susan Sarandon as Sandra Boon
- Jeff Daniels as Sam Manners
- Elizabeth Perkins as Adie Nims
- Kate Reid as Pearne Manners
- Justin Henry as Kyle Boon
- Holly Marie Combs as Debs Boon
- Bernie Sanders as Bernie, a man giving out Halloween candy

== Reception ==
=== Critical response ===
Janet Maslin of The New York Times thought "the rapport between the film's four principals is so well established that its romantic quadrille about the various ups and downs of two humorously contrasting couples really does come to life." She added, "Sweet Hearts Dance . . . approaches love as a series of fits and starts. It approaches narrative in much the same way, which would be more of a problem if the film were not so enjoyably loose-jointed anyhow . . . [It] tends to drift, but it has good humor and an easygoing appeal, not to mention a thoroughly attractive cast."

Roger Ebert of the Chicago Sun-Times rated the film two out of four stars. He felt the screenplay "seems to meander in whatever direction the filmmakers thought they could find an inspiration" but added, "And yet the film is not without merit. All of the performances are interesting, and although I was not surprised that three of the four leads were good, I was surprised at how effective Don Johnson was in his role. It's the best thing he's done, and shows he can do good things." He concluded, "There were times when I thought I'd seen this movie before – maybe in The Four Seasons by Alan Alda or, for that matter, in any film by Alda. Made by sensitive, sophisticated middle-age men about sensitive middle-age men who are a little less sophisticated, the movie drips with nostalgia, but sometimes what everybody seems to want isn't love, but a gift certificate at L.L. Bean. The lifestyle itself threatens to upstage the drama, and as the wholesome New Englanders go about their wholesome New England pastimes, even suffering begins to look picturesque."

Rita Kempley of The Washington Post described the film as "thirtysomething in needlepoint" and commented, "With its comfortable characters and small-town setting, it's as homey as hash – almost as if the director just threw it together like a housewife with unexpected company. It's not a grand movie, but an enjoyable midlife comedy that features Don Johnson in a breakthrough performance."

=== Box office ===
The film was not a box office success, only making $3 million on a budget of $9 million.
