= The Junior Defenders =

- Directed by: Keith Spiegel
- Written by: Keith Spiegel
- Produced by: Keith Spiegel; Brooke Ciardelli
- Starring: Ally Sheedy; Brian O'Halloran; Justin Henry; Jason David Frank; Fred Hazelton
- Narrated by: John Waters
- Cinematography: Mark Sasahara
- Edited by: Keith Spiegel; Rick Giachino; Stephen Beattie
- Production company: Lightyear Entertainment
- Distributed by: Warner Home Video
- Release date: October 23, 2007
- Running time: 82 minutes
- Country: United States
- Language: English
- Budget: $172,000

The Junior Defenders is a 2007 direct-to-video comedy-fantasy film from Warner Bros. starring Ally Sheedy, Brian O'Halloran, Justin Henry, and Jason David Frank.

== Plot ==
With a fanbase that rivaled Star Trek's, The Junior Defenders was one of the top TV hits of the late '70s. 25 years following the show's sudden cancellation, a crazed fan named Norman is still obsessed with the show. In his mania, Norman treks across the country in a stolen Winnebago, kidnapping the four washed-up former child stars, Jill, Mitch, Jimmy, and Tommy, from his beloved childhood program. The kidnappings spark a national media frenzy. Once in Hollywood, Norman takes over a soundstage and forces the cast at gunpoint to act in his brand-new episode of The Junior Defenders.

== Cast ==
- John Waters as Narrator
- Ally Sheedy as Jill Fields
- Brian O'Halloran as Mitch Stone
- Justin Henry as Jimmy Fletcher
- Jason David Frank as Tommy Keen, who shares the same first name with Tommy Oliver from Power Rangers
- Fred Hazelton as Norman Nields

The film features cameo appearances by Pauly Shore, Florence Henderson, Peter Tork, Michael Dukakis, and Kevin Smith.

== Production ==
Originally titled Groupies, the film's principal photography occurred in February–March 1997.
