= See Jane Date =

2003 romantic comedy television film by Robert Berlinger

- DVD cover
- Based on: See Jane Date by Melissa Senate
- Directed by: Robert Berlinger
- Starring: Charisma Carpenter; Holly Marie Combs
- Theme music composer: Douglas J. Cuomo
- Countries of origin: Canada; United States
- Original language: English

Production
- Producers: Ted Babcock; Robert M. Sertne; Randy Sutter; Frank von Zerneck
- Cinematography: Serge Ladouceur
- Editor: Alan Baumgarten
- Running time: 90 minutes
- Production companies: RHI Entertainment; Von Zerneck Sertner Films

Original release
- Network: ABC Family
- Release: August 16, 2003

See Jane Date is a 2003 romantic comedy television film directed by Robert Berlinger and starring Charisma Carpenter and Holly Marie Combs. It is based on Melissa Senate's book of the same name, and premiered on ABC Family on August 16, 2003.

== Synopsis ==
Jane Grant, a single and ambitious assistant editor at a magazine, receives an invitation to her younger cousin's wedding engraved with the words "plus guest". She has already told everyone, including her Aunt Ina and her high school rival Natasha Nutley, who is now famous, that she is in a serious relationship, and she has two months to find a man who fits the story and bring him to the wedding. Her best friends, Eloise and Amanda, set her up on a series of dates that go badly.

== Cast ==
- Charisma Carpenter as Jane Grant
- Holly Marie Combs as Natasha Nutley
- Rachelle Lefevre as Eloise
- Sadie LeBlanc as Amanda
- Antonio Sabato Jr as Timothy Rommelly
- Linda Dano as Aunt Ina
- Joshua Malina as Kevin Adams
- David Lipper as Ethan Miles
- Evan Marriott as Hank Chilton
- Cameron Mathison as Gary Babcock
- Zachary Levi as Grant Asher
- Yannick Bisson as Max Garrett
- Eddie McClintock as Kurt Batner
