= Northern Stage =

- Formation: 1997
- Type: Non-profit theater
- Location(s): Barrette Center for the Arts 74 Gates Street White River Junction, VT 05001
- Artistic Director: Carol Dunne
- Managing Director: Jason Smoller
- Website: https://northernstage.org/

Northern Stage is a regional non-profit LORT (League of Resident Theatres)-D professional theater company located in White River Junction, Vermont founded in 1997 by Brooke Ciardelli and led by Producing Artistic Director Carol Dunne since 2013. Northern Stage is a preeminent year-round theater company in the Upper Valley, offering professional productions of world premieres, classics, and musicals. Off the mainstage, Northern Stage offers extensive educational and outreach programs and develops new works, reaching more than 50,000 community members each year.

Northern Stage’s educational programs focus on professional training in a supportive environment for students of all ages. Offerings include student acting ensembles, summer musical theater intensives, and a theater-in-the-schools residency program.

== History ==
Northern Stage was founded in 1997 by Brooke Wetzel Ciardelli, holding performances at the historic Briggs Opera House for over 15 years. After Ciardelli’s departure in 2013, the Board of Directors engaged Producing Artistic Director Carol Dunne, who spearheaded the fundraising for and construction of the new Barrette Center for the Arts alongside then-Managing Director Eric Bunge in the historic district of downtown White River Junction. The new Barrette Center for the Arts was opened in October of 2015. With a building cost of $7.4 million, this 240-seat modified-thrust theater is Northern Stage's primary performance space.

In 2014, Dunne launched the New Works Now series with a commitment to the creation of new plays and musicals for the American theater. The program has since launched works beginning as developmental readings to the mainstage, Off-Broadway in New York, and beyond.

In 2017, Dunne earned a Genius Grant from the Helen Gurley Brown Foundation for her achievements in theater arts. Soon thereafter, Dunne became the inaugural leader of the BOLD Theater Women’s Leadership Circle, an initiative created to bridge career gaps for women in American theater. The program has supported the elevation of leaders including Tamilla Woodard, Rachel Karpf, Sarah Ramussen, Tinashe Kajese-Bolden, Jess Chayes, Susan Booth, and Christina Baldwin into major roles in theater leadership.

Today, Dunne, Managing Director Jason Smoller, and dozens of theater professional staff are guiding the theater through a project to build new housing for the support of artists and artisans, and an endowment to ensure that the company can provide world class art, education and community connection for generations to come.

== Programs ==
=== Main Stage Productions ===
Northern Stage offers full productions at the Barrette Center for the Arts from September to May each year. The theater draws artists from the region and across the country, including many artists with Broadway, Regional Theater, and National Tour credits. Seasons include world premieres, classics, comedies, dramas, musicals, and new shows fresh from Broadway and London’s West End.

=== Education Programs ===
Northern Stage offers students of all ages a year-round schedule of educational programs, including youth training, in-school programs, and adult learning opportunities, taught by and mentored by working theater professionals. Week-long summer camps include topics such as Shakespeare, dance, singing, musical theater, storytelling, and culminate in a final performance for family and friends.

Northern Stage’s Summer Musical Theater Intensive, designed for students ages 12-18, includes four weeks of rehearsal and culminates in a fully-produced musical.

The Youth Ensemble Studio (YES) program gathers young actors who develop, rehearse, and perform three pieces throughout the season, a Fall Showcase, a Winter White Box production, and a fully-produced Spring production (Shakespeare or musical).

The hallmark of Northern Stage’s educational and outreach programming is the intensive BridgeUP: Theater in the Schools program. BridgeUP brings professional teaching artists into area classrooms for a residency meant to empower students to speak Shakespeare’s language, perform songs, learn choreography, and embrace public performance. The program concludes with a performance held in the Barrette Center for the Arts, providing students the opportunity to perform for their families in a professional setting.

=== New Play Development ===
In 2014, New Works Now began as an annual festival of workshops that culminate in public readings. The program is designed to enrich the theater experience of audiences and artists hungry for daring and impactful stories. New Works Now attracts submissions from all over the country, sees talented performers, directors, and dramaturgs lending their expertise to the process, and often plays to sold-out houses. In recent years, New Works Now has shifted from a festival format to a series of new works workshops throughout the theater season.

Northern Stage’s commitment to new work development serves as a guiding light for the company and has helped rebrand Northern Stage as a bold and visionary theater.

== Performances ==
Productions are listed by the season in which they were performed for the mainstage. This list includes only mainstage shows, other productions held through other Northern Stage programs or in different venues are not listed.

*World Premier Production

Mainstage Shows
Season	Show	Season	Show	Season	Show
'97-98	Arcadia (play)	'14-15	Into the Woods		
'97-98	Cole!	'14-15	Clybourne Park		
'97-98	Shadowlands (play)	'14-15	A Christmas Carol (musical)		
'97-98	The Strange Passenger	'14-15	Blithe Spirit (play)		
'97-98	The Baby Dance	'14-15	Orwell in America*		
'97-98	Wind in the Willows (1985 musical)	'14-15	Songs for a New World		
'97-98	Alice's Adventures in Wonderland	'15-16	Our Town		
		'15-16	Mary Poppins (musical)		
		'15-16	Mad Love*		
		'15-16	Hound of Baskerville		
		'15-16	The Mountaintop		
		'15-16	Living Together		
		'16-17	Macbeth		
		'16-17	A Christmas Carol (musical)		
		'16-17	Trick or Treat*		
		'16-17	Red Hot Lovers		
		'16-17	Grounded (play)		
		'16-17	Mamma Mia! (musical)		
		'17-18	A Doll's House		
		'17-18	This Verse Business		
		'17-18	The Little Mermaid (musical)		
		'17-18	Only Yesterday*		
		'17-18	Disgraced		
		'17-18	Noises Off		
		'18-19	Oslo (play)		
		'18-19	Dear Elizabeth		
		'18-19	Matilda the Musical		
		'18-19	Venus Rising*		
		'18-19	Buyer & Cellar		
		'18-19	Once		
		'19-20	A Doll's House, Part 2		
		'19-20	Jordan*		
		'19-20	The Sound of Music		
		'19-20	King Lear		
		'19-20	Citrus*		
