= Martin's Day =

- Theatrical release poster
- Directed by: Alan Gibson
- Written by: Chris Bryant; Allan Scott
- Produced by: Richard F. Dalton; Roy Krost
- Starring: Richard Harris; Justin Henry; Lindsay Wagner; Karen Black; James Coburn
- Cinematography: Frank Watts
- Edited by: David de Wilde
- Music by: Wilfred Josephs
- Production companies: United Artists; World Film Services
- Distributed by: MGM/UA Entertainment Company
- Release date: February 22, 1985
- Running time: 98 minutes
- Language: English

Martin's Day is a 1985 American drama film directed by Alan Gibson. It stars Richard Harris, Justin Henry, Lindsay Wagner, Karen Black and James Coburn.

== Synopsis ==
The film follows an escaped convict named Martin who kidnaps a boy, also named Martin, while trying to flee via plane. While on the run the two Martins discover that they have many things in common other than just their name and begin to bond.

== Cast ==
- Richard Harris as Martin Steckert
- Lindsay Wagner as Dr. Mennen
- James Coburn as Lt. Lardner
- Justin Henry as Martin
- Karen Black as Karen
- John Ireland as Brewer
- Saul Rubinek as Hitchhiker
- R.H. Thompson as Paul Mennen

== Production ==
Filming for Martin's Day took place in Ontario, Canada during the autumn of 1984, and began shortly after Richard Harris completed an eight-city tour of the musical Camelot. The film's script was written by Chris Bryant and Allan Scott.

== Release ==
Initially intended to release in November 1984, Martin's Day premiered in the United States on February 22, 1985.

== Reception ==
Critical reception was mixed. The Kansas City Star's Robert C. Trussell expressed disappointment in the film, criticizing the lack of acting chemistry between Henry and Harris. A reviewer for the Austin American-Statesman viewed it as a contender for the year's worst film and noted that the filming was done so quickly after Harris's Camelot tour that his hair still bore traces of the orange hair dye used for his performance as King Arthur.

David Pickering of the Corpus Christi Times was more favorable, praising Harris's acting. Martha Steimel of the Wichita Falls Times was similarly favorable citing Henry's acting as a highlight.

== See also ==
- A Perfect World (1993)
