= Justin Henry =

American actor (born 1971)

- Born: Justin Henry; May 25, 1971 (age 55); Rye, New York, U.S.
- Occupations: Businessman, actor
- Years active: 1978–present
- Known for: Billy Kramer in Kramer vs. Kramer (1979)

Justin Henry (born May 25, 1971) is an American actor and businessman, known for playing Billy Kramer in the 1979 film Kramer vs. Kramer, a debut role which earned him an Academy Award for Best Supporting Actor nomination at just eight years old. As of 2025, he remains the youngest Oscar nominee in any category. The performance later earned him a spot (No. 80) on VH1's list of 100 Greatest Kid Stars. Most of his film and television credits came as a child or teenager, although he has continued acting as an adult.

== Early life and education ==
Justin Henry was born in Rye, New York, the son of Michele (née Andrews), a real estate agent, and Clifford Henry, an investment adviser. He was educated at Brunswick School, an all-boys college-preparatory private day school located in Greenwich, Connecticut, followed by Skidmore College, a private liberal arts college in Saratoga Springs, New York, where he earned a B.A. in psychology in 1993.

== Career ==
=== Acting career ===
Henry began his acting career in Kramer vs. Kramer (1979), which was released to widespread praise and won the Academy Award for Best Picture. For his performance as Billy Kramer, a young boy dealing with his parents' separation, he was nominated for the Academy Award and Golden Globe Award for Best Supporting Actor (making him the youngest person to ever be nominated for an Academy Award or Golden Globe) and won the Young Artist Award for Best Leading Young Actor in a Feature Film.

His next role was in a 1983 episode of the American television series Fantasy Island. On the big screen, Henry appeared in the Brat Pack film Sixteen Candles (1984), as Mike, one of main character Samantha's siblings. Henry also played the son of a married couple played by Don Johnson and Susan Sarandon in the film Sweet Hearts Dance (1988). In this role, critic Janet Maslin called him a "large and amusingly sullen teenager".

After graduation, Henry's next widely seen performance was in 1997, as a medical student in a two-episode role during the fourth season of ER. He starred opposite Ally Sheedy, Jason David Frank and Brian O'Halloran in the mockumentary The Junior Defenders, which was filmed that same year but released direct-to-video in 2007.

=== Business career ===
Henry co-founded the Slamdunk Film Festival in 1998. He continues to make occasional appearances in film and television.

== Filmography ==
Film
Year	Title	Role	Notes
1979	Kramer vs. Kramer	Billy Kramer	
1983	Tiger Town	Alex	
1984	Sixteen Candles	Mike Baker	
1985	Martin's Day	Martin	
1985	Double Negative		
1988	Sweet Hearts Dance	Kyle Boon	
1996	Andersonville	Tyce	
1997	ER	Med Student James Sasser	Season 4 Episodes 4 and 5
2003	My Dinner with Jimi	Howard Kaylan	
2003	Finding Home	Prescott	
2004	Lost	Chester Gould	
2007	The Junior Defenders	Jimmy Fletcher	
2008	My Own Worst Enemy	Dr. Rafe Castle	Season 1 Episode 2
2010	Brothers & Sisters	Dr. Lewis	Season 4 Episode 21
2014	Reaper	Caine	
2019	On Cinema	Himself	"The New On Cinema Oscar Special" special

== Awards and nominations ==
Year	Organization	Work	Category	Result	Ref.
1980	52nd Academy Awards	Kramer vs. Kramer	Best Supporting Actor	Nominated	
1980	David di Donatello Awards	Kramer vs. Kramer	Special David	Won	
1980	37th Golden Globe Awards	Kramer vs. Kramer	Best Supporting Actor – Motion Picture	Nominated	
1980	37th Golden Globe Awards	Kramer vs. Kramer	New Star of the Year – Actor	Nominated	
1980	2nd Young Artist Awards	Kramer vs. Kramer	Best Leading Young Actor in a Feature Film	Won	

== Bibliography ==
- Holmstrom, John. The Moving Picture Boy: An International Encyclopaedia from 1895 to 1995, Norwich, Michael Russell, 1996, p. 386-387.
