= Andrea Reimann-Ciardelli =

German-American heiress

- Born: 1956 or 1957 (age 68–69); Germany
- Spouse: married
- Children: 2

Andrea Reimann-Ciardelli (born 1956/57) is a German-born American heiress, through her former 11.1% of JAB Holding Company.

In 2003, she sold her 11.1% stake in JAB Holding Company for nearly $1 billion.

As of June 2019, Forbes estimated her net worth at US $720 million.

She is married with two children, and lives in Hanover, New Hampshire, United States.
