= Brooke Ciardelli =

American theater and film director

Brooke (Wetzel) Ciardelli is an American theater and film director, producer and writer. She founded the award-winning regional theater company Northern Stage in White River Junction, Vermont.

== Early life and education ==
Brooke (Wetzel) Ciardelli was born in Manhattan, New York. Her father, Joseph A. Wetzel (1934 - ), founded Joseph A. Wetzel Associates, a museum design firm and is currently a photographer... Her mother, Joyce E. Dickson (1934-2001), was a corporate art curator for the collections of Terence J. Fox, Greenwich, CT.

After a competitive figure skating career, Ciardelli received her Bachelor of Arts degree from Sarah Lawrence College, with a concentration in theater. She subsequently worked at The Williamstown Theater Festival and the Broadway general managers/producers office of Gatchell & Neufeld.

== Early Career: Film Production ==
In the 1990s, Ciardelli served as Co-Producer for A Stranger In The Kingdom starring Martin Sheen; Producer for The Junior Defenders, starring Ally Sheedy; and Co-Writer and Creative Producer for Wedding Band (My X-Girlfriend's Wedding Reception, starring Mo Gaffney and Debbie Gibson. She served as a Producer of Special Projects for Burlington City Arts and worked for a number of years with the Burlington Jazz Festival and the Ben & Jerry's Festival, as well as providing management services to a number of bands and singer/songwriters, including Jon Fishman's side project Spastic, the Martin Guigui Band, the Chad Hollister Band, and others.

== Founding of Northern Stage ==
Ciardelli founded the Northern Stage Theater Company (Washington Post, Jonathan Finer), a non-profit, regional theater, in Burlington, VT in 1994. In 1997, Ciardelli moved the company to the historic Briggs Opera House in White River Junction (as reported in the Vermont Standard and the Vermont Times).

Ciardelli led the company as artistic director and CEO from 1997 to 2012, during which time Northern Stage produced 111 main stage productions over 16 seasons, 52 directed or co-directed 52 by Ciardelli. (Boston Herald, Terry Byrne.), and won five Moss Hart Awards for Excellence in Theater from the New England Theatre Conference.

Ciardelli also won an Addison Award for The Shrew Tamer, which she adapted and directed, and an Owl Award for Best Artistic Director.

As well as play readings, Ciardelli held enrichment activities in conjunction with some of the productions, and collaborated with other organizations, including Opera North (U.S.A.), Dartmouth College's Hood Museum of Art and The AVA Gallery). Ciardelli also established the "Celebrity Saturday" talk-back series to allow audiences to interact directly with professional actors and directors, as well as the Athena Sunday series of expert pre-show lectures.

Ciardelli developed a series of educational programs, supported by various charitable and educational foundations, for fifth and sixth graders in Vermont and New Hampshire, including acting, singing, dancing, filmmaking and playwriting workshops led by working theater professionals from New York and around the country. The young performers and playwrights could see their work performed by professional actors, directors and designers on the Briggs Opera House stage. Ciarelli also arranged matinee productions of the company's professional productions for students. In 2011, Ciardelli developed and implemented a National Endowment for the Arts literacy program, with events available live, over the Internet and via community access cable.

A major collaboration with Dartmouth-Hitchcock Medical Center and Dartmouth Medical School to send students and medical residents to Northern Stage's production of Wit. Other major collaborations have involved Opera North, Pentangle Arts Council, The Haven, CATV-8 Community Access Television, the Center for Cartoon Studies, Norwich University, the Hartford Library, the Quechee Library, and many area non-profits.

== Director and Producer ==
In her career, Ciardelli has directed over 60 productions in association with Northern Stage. (CT Valley Spectator, Aaron Nobel). As a director, she has been honored by the New England Theatre Conference's Moss Hart Awards for Excellence in Theater three times.

Ciardelli directed a staged reading of Arthur Miller's then-unpublished Resurrection Blues, with the playwright himself in residence; has directed Patrick Stewart and Lisa Harrow in Who's Afraid of Virginia Woolf?; and worked with British playwright Sonja Linden on the American Premiere of The Strange Passenger.

Ciardelli has directed eight World Premieres, 11 regional premieres, and premiere performances in Europe and Africa, including productions of Wit, The Beauty Queen of Leenane, I Am My Own Wife, Pride's Crossing, and No Orchids for Miss Blandish, as well as a number of large-scale musicals. She has worked with actors from Broadway, London's West End, and around the world, as well as touring, as co-director, with I Am My Own Wife to Harare, Zimbabwe and Edinburgh, Scotland. In the summer of 2010, she co-directed a production of Macbeth with Castle Theatre Company, which toured England and the northeast U.S., including Off-West End and Off-Broadway performances.

Ciardelli has adapted a number of classical pieces for the stage. In 2007 she was commissioned by Dartmouth College to adapt Ovid's Metamorphoses. Her play The O Myths was performed as the basis of an international exchange between actors from New York City, Zimbabwe, Mexico, and Romania. (The Herald.)

Ed Siegel of The Boston Globe said in his review that The Shrew Tamer "feels a little like listening to a symphony orchestra speed through an edited version of Mahler before going all-out in Mantovani".

Working with director Nicolas Kent, then the artistic director of the Tricycle Theatre in London, she produced the U.S. premiere of a new adaptation of Lee Blessing's A Walk In The Woods, performed for the first time with a male/female cast, at Northern Stage; the production subsequently transferred to The Tricycle Theatre. Additional producing includes: The Art Of The Storyteller - An Evening with Jodi Picoult, U.S. producer; Tom Crean – Antarctic Adventure, (Irish Repertory, NYC; Sugan Theatre, Boston; Big Arts, Florida; Northern Stage; Vermont, on tour since 2005 in U.K., Europe and Australia); world premiere of A Christmas Carol – the musical written by Robert J. Cronin; Take Two, a new musical written by Brett Schrier and Catherine Doherty

Ciardelli has partnered with U.K. based Developing Artist; site-specific London company Specifiq, and is working with VOICETheatre, New York City. She is a Visiting Fellow of University College, Durham University, Durham, England; a guest artist and lecturer at the Vienna International School; Chad's College, Durham University, England; Harare International Festival of the Arts, Zimbabwe; Durham Drama Festival, England, the Elderhostel Program Tour to the Fringe Festival, Edinburgh, Scotland; Dartmouth College, State University of New York, Albany; NH; New England Theatre Conference, Boston, MA; Phi Beta Capa, Regional Conference, Northeast Region; Kendal at Hanover, NH; Adventures in Learning, NH; Keene State College, NH and a teaching artist for the Vermont Arts Council.

At the end of 2012, with a modernized, Arabic-American-Muslim interpretation of Miller's A View from the Bridge under development, Ciardelli left the Northern Stage company.

In March 2013, Ciardelli directed A.R. Gurney's Black Tie at Vienna's English Theatre.

As a producer, she works with the J.C. Manheimer Agency, is a consultant to Global Campuses Foundation and worked with New World Power as a producer of Special Events and trade shows.
