= Charmed: The Book of Shadows =

Soundtrack album by Various artists
- Released: January 1, 2005
- Genre: Pop rock
- Labels: Image; Silva Screen

Charmed: The Book of Shadows (also known as Charmed: The Book of Shadows: Music From and Inspired By) is the second soundtrack album of the television series Charmed, which aired on The WB in the United States. It features music from the show's first seven seasons and was released on April 19, 2005, by Image Entertainment.

== Background and release ==
Charmed: The Book of Shadows was executive produced by Jonathan Platt and Jonathan Scott Miller. The album includes music by contemporary pop artists such as Dido, Vanessa Carlton, Sarah McLachlan and Ashlee Simpson. It also includes Charmed's theme song "How Soon Is Now?" by Love Spit Love. Charmed: The Book of Shadows was released in the United States on April 19, 2005 and in the United Kingdom on September 5, 2005.

The soundtrack's cover features a small photograph of the show's Book of Shadows, which the soundtrack is named after.

== Reception ==
Heather Phares of AllMusic gave Charmed: The Book of Shadows three stars out of five and praised the way in which the soundtrack "streamlines its approach", in comparison to the first soundtrack album, by focusing on a wide variety of female artists, echoing the theme of female empowerment raised in the television series. However, she also noted that its contents had little in relation to the show itself. Nonetheless, Phares concluded that the album "plays a lot more like a handmade mixtape or playlist than a soundtrack full of promotional opportunities, which can only be to its credit." On May 7, 2005, Charmed: The Book of Shadows debuted at number 9 on the US Billboard Top Soundtracks chart and number 20 on the US Billboard Top Independent Albums chart.

== Track listing ==
No.	Title	Artist(s)	Length
1.	"How Soon Is Now?"	Love Spit Love	4:25
2.	"Take It Off"	The Donnas	2:40
3.	"Take a Look"	Liz Phair	3:29
4.	"Sand in My Shoes"	Dido	4:59
5.	"Fallen" (Dan the Automator Remix)	Sarah McLachlan	3:43
6.	"I Can't Make Me" (Chris Lord-Alge Remix)	Butterfly Boucher	3:31
7.	"San Francisco"	Vanessa Carlton	4:12
8.	"Pieces of Me" (David Garcia and High Spies Remix)	Ashlee Simpson	3:15
9.	"Unbroken"	Missy Higgins	3:39
10.	"Free" (Swiss American Federation Club Mix)	Sarah Brightman	3:31
11.	"I Close My Eyes"	Shivaree	3:55
12.	"Home"	Zero 7	4:35

== Charts ==
Charts (2005)	Peak position
US Billboard Top Soundtracks	9
US Billboard Top Independent Albums	20

== Release history ==
Region	Date	Format	Label	Ref.
United States	April 19, 2005	CD	Image Entertainment	
United Kingdom	September 5, 2005	CD	Silva Screen Records	
