= Charmed: Season 10 =

Comic book series

Publication information
- Publisher: Zenescope Entertainment
- Schedule: Monthly
- Genre: Fantasy comics
- Publication date: October 8, 2014 – September 14, 2016
- No. of issues: 20
- Main character(s): Prue Halliwell; Piper Halliwell; Phoebe Halliwell; Paige Matthews

Creative team
- Written by: Pat Shand
- Penciller(s): Elisa Féliz (1–5, 8–12, 14-20); Daniela Di Matteo (6–7)
- Letterer(s): Jim Campbell (1–2); Christy Sawyer (3–12)
- Colorist: Valentina Cuomo (1–12)
- Editor: Paul Ruditis

Charmed: Season 10 is a comic book series that was published monthly by Zenescope Entertainment, which owns the publishing rights to the Charmed comic book series. Written by Pat Shand and edited by Paul Ruditis, the series was an officially licensed continuation of both the popular television series of the same name, which ended its eight-year run in 2006, and the preceding comic series, Charmed: Season 9 (2010–2012). The first issue debuted at New York Comic Con on October 8, 2014, and continued for 20 issues.

The series narrative followed the Charmed Ones – sisters Piper and Phoebe Halliwell and Paige Matthews – the most powerful good witches in history who use their combined "Power of Three" to protect innocent lives from demonic beings. After being reunited with their elder sister, Prue, who was killed less than a decade earlier, and the former-demon Cole Turner, the Charmed Ones must vanquish demons who threaten the safety of their magic. Its chronology succeeds the events of the eight television seasons, Season 9, and the novels The War on Witches and Let Gorgons Be Gorgons.

== Publication ==
=== Issues ===
Issue in Series	Issue in Season	Title	Written by	Penciled by	Original Release Date
Season 10: Volume 1
25	1	"No Country for Old Ones"	Pat Shand	Elisa Féliz	October 8, 2014
THE WAIT... IS OVER! The Power of Three finally returns in Zenescope's official continuation of CHARMED! When an ancient evil older than time itself targets the Charmed Ones, they will have to call on help from the magical community... including their estranged sister Prue and the former demon Cole... for help. But will it be enough when an Old One sets its sights on the Halliwells? An all new epic storyline begins, written by Pat Shand (Robyn Hood, Grimm Fairy Tales) and up-and-coming artist Elisa Féliz, edited by Charmed fan favorite Paul Ruditis!
26	2	"Magically Malicious"	Pat Shand	Elisa Féliz	November 5, 2014
Low level demons have never been a threat to the Charmed Ones... until now. When Fritz and Valen, a pair of demons that has been secretly observing the sisters, get their hands on a weapon capable of destroying souls, the Halliwells will face their most dangerous foes yet. Also leprechauns!
27	3	"The Perks of Being a Whitelighter"	Pat Shand	Elisa Féliz	December 10, 2014
As a pair of ne'er-do-well demons attempt to activate a weapon that could mean the end of the Charmed Ones, Paige takes on a new charge. But what will she do when her latest witch in training turns into... well, a bunch of cats? Also, the Angel of Death is back, but not in a way anyone will expect... least of all the Angel himself.
28	4	"Charmed Assault"	Pat Shand	Elisa Féliz	January 21, 2015
The Charmed Ones race into their final battle with Valen, and when all is said and done, their lives will be forever changed. Plus, Phoebe + Cole = ?
29	5	"Whatever Happened to the Demon with a Soul?"	Pat Shand	Elisa Féliz	February 18, 2015
After the devastating events of last issue, the Charmed Ones lives are changed forever. Left to pick up the pieces, the survivors must bring the Ancient Athame to Prue... but to what end? Cole makes a decision.
30	6	"Will o' the Witch"	Pat Shand	Daniela Di Matteo	March 18, 2015
After suffering a tragic loss at the hands of an evil older than time itself, one of the Halliwell sisters takes a trip across the country and crosses paths with a will o' the wisp. However, this troubled spirit has much more planned than merely leading its targets astray...
Season 10: Volume 2
31	7	"Hard Knox Life"	Pat Shand	Daniela Di Matteo	April 22, 2015
Remember when the Charmed Ones defeated evil and lived a life of peace? Remember how the Charmed Ones defeated Gaxageal and prevented the rise of the Old Ones, all within the tidy confines of a single issue? Yeah, none of that worked. Knox is back. Leo's life is on the line. Prue's getting all sorts of creepy. And a new, horrible, decidedly Old villain rises...
32	8	"Love is a Burning Thing"	Pat Shand	Elisa Féliz	May 20, 2015
When Tyler Michaels discovers his powers evolving beyond that of a firestarter, he seeks out Paige, who has disturbing answers for him. Meanwhile, Coop and Henry plot to pull off the impossible... and they just might have to call on a newly empowered Tyler for help. As a new arc begins in Season Ten, the truth about Prue's isolation at the hands of her sisters will come to light. Everything is about to change!
33	9	"Haste Makes Wasteland"	Pat Shand	Elisa Féliz	June 10, 2015
Nothing is what it seems when Henry, Coop, and Tyler return from a place they probably should've never gone in the first place. Meanwhile, Prue and an old frenemy are learning about what it means to be the Guardian of the Nexus of the All... and if Prue ever was the Guardian to begin with. Change is coming...
34	10	"The Curious Case of Benjamin Turner"	Pat Shand	Elisa Féliz	July 22, 2015
Answers, revelations, and returns! Prue, armed with the knowledge of what she has become, decides to take charge of her situation... leaving Kyra with a whole new world at her fingertips. Meanwhile, when Coop and Henry's actions come to light, the Charmed Ones find themselves divided.
35	11	"Fear Always Comes Back"	Pat Shand	Elisa Féliz	September 2, 2015
After the fallout of the last issue has settled, life goes on for the Charmed Ones. That is, until an old enemy sets his sights on Paige and her new charges...
36	12	"Virtue"	Pat Shand	Elisa Féliz	October 7, 2015
Prue gets in touch with her inner self. Kyra returns - again. And the Charmed Ones make a hard decision about Prue's future that will rock the Power of Three to its core. Darkness descends in Charmed: Season Ten...
Season 10: Volume 3
37	13	"Court of Love"	Pat Shand	Giorgia Sposito	November 4, 2015
Phoebe and Coop stand before the Court of Love, awaiting judgment for Coop's actions. Piper and Leo approach the Elders for help with the Prue dilemma. Paige and Henry find themselves contemplating a future apart. Ben and Kyra join together to help Prue descend into the Demonic Wasteland for answers. Yeah, none of this is going to go well.
38	14	"The Four Sisters, Chapter 1"	Pat Shand	Elisa Féliz	December 2, 2015
With the temporary spell wearing out, the Charmed Ones race to find a way to protect their family from Prue's powers without killing her. As they prepare to do a dangerous spell, the shape-shifting Big Bad that has seized control of one of their own is setting its plan in motion.
39	15	"The Four Sisters, Chapter 2"	Pat Shand	Elisa Féliz	January 13, 2016
When Heremus' host is revealed as one of the Charmed One's closest allies, the Halliwells join together in a race against time to save the world... but at what cost? Change is coming...
40	16	"Happy Ending"	Pat Shand	Elisa Féliz	February 10, 2016
Prue enters into a final battle with Heremus. As she and the Old One fight for Tyler's soul, the Charmed Ones must defend the world from an army of monsters descending from the skies. When all is said and done, will the four sisters finally be reunited as a family?
41	17	"Effigy"	Pat Shand	Elisa Féliz	March 2, 2016
After last issue's happy ending, it seems that all is right with the Charmed Ones. However, when a seemingly casual trip to their father reveals something startling, everything that has happened to them is called into question. With the advent of the Old Ones approaching...will the Charmed Ones stand on the side of good or evil?
42	18	"Tribunal and Tribulations"	Pat Shand	Elisa Féliz	April 13, 2016
While the Charmed Ones are scrambling to figure out an answer to their new problem, Prue has a dramatic meeting with the Tribunal regarding an incident with Tyler. The thing masquerading as Knox makes his intentions regarding the Advent of the Old Ones clear, leaving an old ally of the Charmed Ones wondering what he can do to help them in the eleventh hour.
43	19	"Something Old, Something Prue"	Pat Shand	Elisa Féliz	July 6, 2016
As friends and frenemies from the past reach out to assist the Charmed Ones, Prue seeks help from Tyler to save the world. As the situation with the Old Ones continues to worsen, the strength of the sisters' bond will face its greatest test yet.
44	20	"The Reason"	Pat Shand	Elisa Féliz	September 14, 2016
The Charmed Ones, Prue, and all of their loved ones gather in Salem for a reckoning. As Paige takes a stand for her family and Piper is faced with the consequences of her actions, a door closes on the past and hope dawns on a brand-new future.

=== Collected editions ===
The issues are collected into trade paperback by Zenescope Entertainment after each story arc is complete.

Issue in Series	Issue in Season	Title	Written by	Penciled by	Original Release Date
5	1	"Volume 1"	Pat Shand	Elisa Féliz, Daniela Di Matteo	April 29, 2015
The youngest Charmed Ones – Piper, Phoebe, and Paige – reunite with their elder sister, Prue, and the former-demon Cole Turner to defeat demonic forces of evil threatening San Francisco.
6	2	"Volume 2"	Pat Shand	Elisa Féliz, Daniela Di Matteo	September 6, 2016
7	3	"Volume 3"	Pat Shand	Elisa Féliz, Daniela Di Matteo, Giorgia Esposito	October 11, 2016

== Reception ==
=== Commercial performance ===
The series' first trade volume had 451 units accounted in Diamond Comic Distributors' distributed comic shops during its release month, April 2015, placing it 344th on the trade paperbacks chart.

Charmed: Season 10: Physical sales per issue (in thousands)

Volume 1
#	Sales	Average	Diamond ranking
1	3,777	2,587 (Note: Average is based on the known sales of issues #1–4 and #6, due to the sales of issue #5 being unknown.)	421
2	2,667	2,587	416
3	2,462	2,587	420
4	2,111	2,587	389
5	—N/a	2,587	—N/a
6	1,919	2,587	438

Volume 2
#	Sales	Average	Diamond ranking
7		XXXXX	
8		XXXXX	
9		XXXXX	
10		XXXXX	
11		XXXXX	
12		XXXXX	

Volume 3
#	Sales	Average	Diamond ranking
13		XXXXX	
14		XXXXX	
15		XXXXX	
16		XXXXX	
17		XXXXX	
18		XXXXX	
19		XXXXX	
20		XXXXX	
