= Charmed season 4 =

Season of television series

Charmed
- Season 4
- DVD cover
- Starring: Alyssa Milano; Rose McGowan; Holly Marie Combs; Brian Krause; Julian McMahon; Dorian Gregory
- No. of episodes: 22

Release
- Original network: The WB
- Original release: October 4, 2001 – May 16, 2002

Season chronology
- ← Previous; Season 3 Next → Season 5

The fourth season of Charmed, an American supernatural drama television series created by Constance M. Burge, originally aired in the United States on The WB from October 4, 2001, through May 16, 2002. Airs on Thursdays at 9:00 pm. Paramount Home Entertainment released the complete fourth season in a six-disc boxed set on February 28, 2006. It was later released on high-definition blu-ray on June 15, 2021.

This season also saw the introduction of Rose McGowan as Paige Matthews half-sister to Prue, Piper and Phoebe and a slight alteration of the opening credits, due to the third season departure of Shannen Doherty as Prue.

== Cast and characters ==
=== Main ===
- Alyssa Milano as Phoebe Halliwell
- Rose McGowan as Paige Matthews / The Evil Enchantress
- Holly Marie Combs as Piper Halliwell
- Brian Krause as Leo Wyatt
- Julian McMahon as Cole Turner (Note: McMahon is only credited for the episodes he appears in.)
- Dorian Gregory as Darryl Morris (Note: Gregory is only credited for the episodes he appears in.)

=== Recurring ===
- Jennifer Rhodes as Penny Halliwell
- James Read as Victor Bennett
- Finola Hughes as Patty Halliwell
- Krista Allen as The Source's Oracle
- Ben Guillory and Peter Woodward as The Source of All Evil
- Jesse Woodrow as Glen Balland
- Debbi Morgan as The Seer
- Rebecca Balding as Elise Rothman
- Tony Amendola and Michael Des Barres as Dark Priest
- Deborah Kellner as Julie

=== Guest ===
- Jordan Bridges as Shane
- James Hong as Zen Master
- Daniel Dae Kim as Yen Lo
- Robert Englund as Gammill
- Charlie Weber as The Prince
- Bethany Joy Lenz as Lady Julia
- Alex Breckenridge as Michelle Miglis
- Anthony Starke as Devlin
- Patrick Fischler as Foreman
- Cleo King as Tanya
- Ray Wise as Ludlow
- Frances Bay as Old Phoebe Halliwell
- Harry Van Gorkum as Kurzon
- Coolio as Lazarus Demon
- Costas Mandylor as Rick Lang
- Louis Mandylor as Nathan Lang
- Armin Shimerman as the Wizard
- Jaime Gomez as Greg Conroy
- Carel Struycken as The Tall Man
- Dakin Matthews as the Angel of Destiny
- Bruce Campbell as Agent Jackman
- Michael Des Barres as Dark Priest

=== Special Musical Guest ===
- Dave Navarro
- Rebekah Ryan

== Episodes ==
No. overall	No. in season	Title	Directed by	Written by	Original release date	Prod. code	U.S. viewers (millions)
67	1	"Charmed Again"	Michael Schultz	Brad Kern	October 4, 2001	62015-04-067	5.97
68	2	"Charmed Again"	Mel Damski	Brad Kern	October 4, 2001	62015-04-068	5.97
Leo was able to save Piper, but was unable to heal Prue. Piper and Phoebe must now deal with the loss of their elder sister and the loss of the Power of Three. However, The Source discovers an unknown half-sister named Paige Matthews, the daughter of Patty and her Whitelighter, Sam, who had been kept hidden. Paige, the now-youngest Halliwell can restore the Power of Three and reunite the sisters' strength as witches. Piper and Phoebe must find Paige to destroy the demon Shax and to stop The Source from getting to her first, allowing them to become once again the Charmed Ones and reconstituting the Power of Three. A 48 hour window threatens the Charmed Ones existence as Paige needs to choose which side she'll serve, a flaw that The Source takes advantage of to entice Paige to evil.
69	3	"Hell Hath No Fury"	Chris Long	Krista Vernoff	October 11, 2001	62015-04-069	5.03
Paige takes the Book of Shadows into her work to cast spells which help her co-workers. Meanwhile, Piper, who is filled with anger over the death of Prue and the recent actions of Paige, is turned into a member of a supernatural band of vigilantes known as the Furies.
70	4	"Enter the Demon"	Joel J. Feigenbaum	Daniel Cerone	October 18, 2001	62015-04-071	5.74
Paige makes a major blunder when carelessly mixing potions for Piper while secretly wishing she could be in Phoebe's shoes training for combat, and ends up switching bodies with Phoebe. While the two sisters try to reverse the spell and struggle to harness each other's powers, they must battle a Zen Master's powerful disciple who has turned evil against his mentor and opened up a portal between two worlds.
71	5	"Size Matters"	Noel Nosseck	Nell Scovell	October 25, 2001	62015-04-070	5.29
Phoebe and Piper do not take Paige seriously when she has a weird feeling about a creepy old house, landing Phoebe in the clutches of a hideous demon named Gammill (Robert Englund) and shrunk to a powerless five inches tall. When Paige and Piper also walk into the demon's trap, his collection is complete.
72	6	"A Knight to Remember"	David Straiton	Alison Schapker & Monica Breen	November 1, 2001	62015-04-072	4.69
Paige's favorite (self-made) childhood fairy tale—which she could never remember being able to recall parts of suddenly becomes real, bringing her face-to-face with her past life as an Evil Enchantress from Medieval times and into the arms of a knight in shining armor. Phoebe and Piper go back in time to vanquish the Evil Enchantress and end up trapped in the Dark Ages, leaving Paige and Leo to rescue them. At the same time, Piper and Phoebe have to periodically fight an electrical demon who is plaguing them, but they need the Power of Three spell to vanquish it. Piper and Phoebe put forward the idea to Paige that she should move into the manor with them.
73	7	"Brain Drain"	John Behring	Curtis Kheel	November 8, 2001	62015-04-073	4.75
After being warned about the chameleon demon by Cole, Piper wants to give the source an agreement of peace. When Piper, Phoebe, and Paige go to vanquish a demon, The Source kidnaps Piper and tries to brainwash her. The Source sends Piper into a deep coma, where she perceives an alternate reality thanks to a demon named Alastair. Everyone in Piper's alternate reality plays on her deepest desire. Phoebe and Paige must find a way to return her to reality and save her from giving up their powers while she is delusional. Leo ultimately comes and heals Piper's mind which brought her back to reality.
74	8	"Black as Cole"	Les Landau	Story by : Abbey Campbell; Teleplay by : Brad Kern & Nell Scovell	November 15, 2001	62015-04-074	5.10
In the midst of mulling over his marriage proposal, Phoebe faces her inner demons while she also comes face-to-face with Cole's demonic past. When a demon from the brotherhood arises killing witches, imitating Cole's ruse as an ADA Sikes, a victim whose Fiance was killed by Cole, seeks revenge on Cole's demon. The A.D.A lures a witch and reveals his true identity, a demon named Sikes who looks exactly like Belthazar. Cole has to embrace his demonic side completely to kill Sikes. To bring Cole's humanity back, his powers end up getting stripped. Meanwhile, Paige encourages Piper and Leo to test their readiness to become parents.
75	9	"Muse to My Ears"	Joel J. Feigenbaum	Krista Vernoff	December 13, 2001	62015-04-075	4.46
Phoebe, Paige, and Piper must stop warlocks who are enslaving the world's muses to use their divine creative inspiration for evil. In the midst of the assault, Cole becomes testy about Phoebe's rebuffing his marriage proposal and is concerned that without his demonic powers he can no longer protect the love of his life.
76	10	"A Paige from the Past"	James L. Conway	Daniel Cerone	January 17, 2002	62015-04-076	3.42
With Leo as her guide, Paige goes back in time to her teenage years, in an attempt to resolve her feelings about the accident that killed her parents. Meanwhile, Piper must prevent ghosts, who have inhabited Phoebe's and Cole's bodies, from fulfilling their mission.
77	11	"Trial by Magic"	Scott Laughlin	Michael Gleason	January 24, 2002	62015-04-077	4.14
While serving on jury for a murder trial, Phoebe has a premonition that reveals the defendant is innocent despite the overwhelming evidence against him. As she desperately stalls in the jury room, Piper, Paige, and Leo frantically try to discover the real killer in time to free the wrongly accused man.
78	12	"Lost and Bound"	Noel Nosseck	Nell Scovell	January 31, 2002	62015-04-078	3.89
When Paige discovers that an 11-year-old runaway named Tyler is a Firestarter Witch, she whisks him to the manor for safekeeping, but soon discovers that his foster parents are demonic bounty hunters who are trying to take him to a Demon Academy where he will become a bodyguard for The Source. Meanwhile, Phoebe is given Grams' wedding ring by Cole, but to their surprise the ring has been cursed to transform the wearer into a traditional 1950s suburban housewife.
79	13	"Charmed and Dangerous"	Jon Paré	Alison Schapker & Monica Breen	February 7, 2002	62015-04-079	4.74
The Source breaks an age-old agreement between good and evil by stealing The Hollow, an ancient vapor which he uses to absorb Piper and Paige's powers. Meanwhile, Phoebe must allow Cole to help them, despite her having a premonition involving Cole sacrificing his life to save her from evil, but there may be more to the premonition that Phoebe cannot see.
80	14	"The Three Faces of Phoebe"	Joel J. Feigenbaum	Curtis Kheel	February 14, 2002	62015-04-080	4.66
Phoebe develops a case of cold feet over marrying Cole and casts a spell which brings a young innocent Phoebe and an old cynical Phoebe to the Manor to help her make a decision. Meanwhile, The Source's chief rival, who believes that he is dead, is convinced by the Seer to kill the Charmed Ones in order to earn the allegiance of the entire Underworld.
81	15	"Marry-Go-Round"	Chris Long	Daniel Cerone	March 14, 2002	62015-04-081	4.48
As Phoebe prepares for her wedding day, she is completely unaware that Cole has consumed the Source's powers and is now the Source himself . Meanwhile, when the Seer tells Cole that if he can marry Phoebe in a "dark way", it will insure that their future son will be the most powerful, evil being ever.
82	16	"The Fifth Halliwheel"	David Straiton	Krista Vernoff	March 21, 2002	62015-04-082	4.82
Paige, who feels like a fifth wheel among her happily married sisters and their husbands, becomes firmly convinced that Cole is still evil. Cole, the new Source, and the Seer secretly plot to impregnate Phoebe. Meanwhile, the sisters try to save a columnist as Cole tries to get Paige out of the way through his demonic contacts in The Underworld.
83	17	"Saving Private Leo"	John Behring	Story by : Doug E. Jones; Teleplay by : Daniel Cerone	March 28, 2002	62015-04-083	3.87
When two ghosts from Leo's past return to seek revenge, Leo faces his demons by submitting, causing Piper's life to be threatened, and leaving Paige to deal with the situation. Meanwhile, Cole tries to convince Phoebe they need a home of their own.
84	18	"Bite Me"	John T. Kretchmer	Curtis Kheel	April 18, 2002	62015-04-084	3.60
A Vampire Queen tries to dethrone Cole as ruler of The Underworld and attempts to turn Paige against her sisters by turning her into a vampire. Meanwhile, Phoebe begins to feel under the weather and gets surprising news.
85	19	"We're Off to See the Wizard"	Timothy J. Lonsdale	Alison Schapker & Monica Breen	April 25, 2002	62015-04-085	4.18
Phoebe tells Piper and Paige that she is pregnant, and that Cole is the father. Meanwhile, Piper and Paige team up with a wizard (Armin Shimerman) to stop the coronation of the new Source, unaware that it is Cole and Phoebe is soon to be his Queen of the Underworld.
86	20	"Long Live the Queen"	Jon Paré	Krista Vernoff	May 2, 2002	62015-04-086	4.70
Phoebe accepts her new role in Cole's life, but she still sets out to save an innocent after she has a premonition and even seeks her sisters' help in protecting the man. Meanwhile, Piper's heart doesn't seem to be in it as she prepares to defend her family against any new threats from The Underworld.
87	21	"Womb Raider"	Mel Damski	Daniel Cerone	May 9, 2002	62015-04-087	4.98
The Seer plans to steal Phoebe's unborn baby so she can raise the child to become the next Source and prevent the throne from passing on to another demon. Meanwhile, the baby begins to take over control of Phoebe's body, which proves dangerous to Paige.
88	22	"Witch Way Now?"	Brad Kern	Brad Kern	May 16, 2002	62015-04-088	5.22
When the Angel of Destiny offers the sisters a chance to relinquish their powers and lead normal lives as a reward for vanquishing the Source of All Evil, their decision is put on the back burner. The sisters try to avoid an FBI agent who has them under surveillance, while also dealing with Cole's calls for help, who is trapped in another realm, holding onto his love for Phoebe. Meanwhile, Piper finds out that she is pregnant.
