= Holly Marie Combs =

American actress

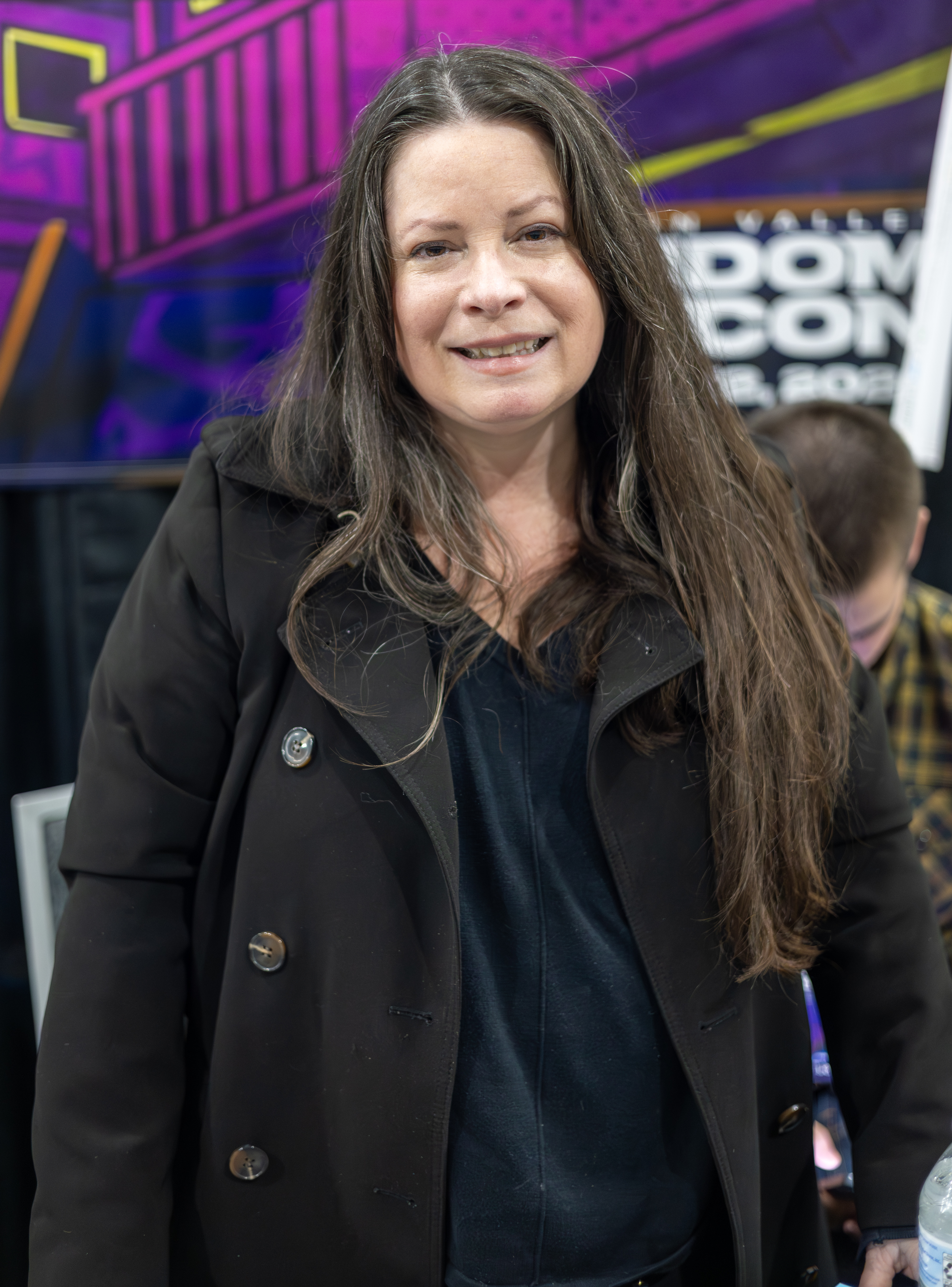
- Combs in 2026
- Born: December 3, 1973 (age 52); San Diego, California, U.S.
- Occupations: Actress; producer
- Years active: 1985–2019 (actress); 2020–present (social media personality; podcaster)
- Known for: Picket Fences; Charmed; Pretty Little Liars
- Spouses: Bryan Travis Smith (m. 1993; div. 1997) David Donoho (m. 2004; div. 2011) Mike Ryan (m. 2019)
- Children: 3

Holly Marie Combs Ryan (born December 3, 1973) is an American retired actress. She gained recognition for playing Kimberly Brock in the CBS series Picket Fences (1992–1996) and had her first leading film role in the slasher Dr. Giggles (1992). The former earned her a Young Artist Award and a Screen Actors Guild Award nomination.

Her breakthrough came with the leading role of Piper Halliwell in the WB fantasy drama series Charmed (1998–2006), which introduced her to a wider audience. After appearing in a number of television films, she returned to attention with the role of Ella Montgomery in the Freeform drama thriller series Pretty Little Liars (2010–2017). Her other projects include a 2015 Great American Country travel documentary series with Charmed co-star Shannen Doherty, and a podcast titled House of Halliwell (2024–present).

== Early life ==
Combs was born in San Diego, California, and is of Irish descent. At the time of her birth, her mother, Lauralei Combs was 15 years old, and her father was 17. Combs's biological parents married, but the two split up after two years, feeling they were too young to make a marriage work.

While Combs was learning to walk, she fell and hit her head on a marble table, resulting in a noticeable 'split' at the top of her right eyebrow. She lived in many different homes with her mother, near the beach in San Diego, often having very little privacy, while her mother attempted to pursue an acting career. When Combs was seven, she and her mother moved to New York City where she spent most of her growing years. Combs was 12 when her mother married her stepfather. In New York City, Combs attended Beekman Hill Elementary and then the Professional Children's School. In an interview when she was in Sydney, Australia, for Supanova Expo, she said that she was a certified scuba diver at 13.

== Career ==
=== 1985–1992: Career beginnings ===
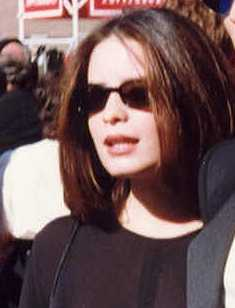
Combs at the 1993 Emmy Awards

When she was 14 years old, Combs landed her first major role in Sweet Hearts Dance (1988), a comedy drama film directed by Robert Greenwald. She played Debs Boon, the daughter of Wiley Boon (played by Don Johnson) and Sandra Boon (played by Susan Sarandon). Her next major role was in Oliver Stone's Born on the Fourth of July (1989), a film adaptation of the best selling autobiography of the same name by Vietnam War veteran Ron Kovic. Combs portrayed Jenny in the film, which also starred Tom Cruise. Her other roles included Helena in the 1989 anthology film New York Stories, and Kim Fields in Hal Hartley's Simple Men (1992). Also in 1992, Combs made an appearance in Temístocles López's Chain of Desire as Diana, and in the slasher film Dr. Giggles, in which she played Jennifer Campbell, the 19-year-old daughter of Tom Campbell (played by Cliff De Young) and girlfriend of Max Anderson (played by Glenn Quinn).

=== 1993–2000: Breakthrough to stardom with Picket Fences and Charmed ===
Combs's first major breakthrough as an actress came at the age of 18, in the CBS television series Picket Fences. She portrayed Kimberly Brock, the daughter of Sheriff Jimmy Brock (played by Tom Skerritt) and his first wife Lydia for the show's four seasons (1992–96). Jimmy's second wife, Dr. Jill Brock (played by Kathy Baker), was her character's stepmother. Combs auditioned for the role in New York. The casting director told her that she wasn't right for the part because she "didn't have a big enough heart." Combs retorted, "If you're looking for someone with a big heart, what the hell are you doing in New York?" She was later called back and offered the job. Combs won a Young Artist Award for her performance on the show. During 1996, Combs starred as Sophie DiMatteo in Sins of Silence, a drama/horror television film directed by Sam Pillsbury. The following year, Combs portrayed real-life convicted murderer Diane Zamora in the television film Love's Deadly Triangle: The Texas Cadet Murder, and appeared in the fact-based drama film Daughters as Alex Morell, one of the two daughters of a murdered heiress.

In 1998, Combs landed a lead role in The WB television series Charmed, in which she portrayed Piper Halliwell, the middle of three sisters who are witches. Following Shannen Doherty's departure after season three (2000–01), Combs's character became the eldest sister for the remaining five seasons of the show. Combs also became a producer for Charmed from season five onwards. The series ended its eight-season run on May 21, 2006. In 2007 and 2008, AOL named Combs's character Piper the third-greatest witch in television history. Combs was the only cast member to appear in every episode of the series, including the original unaired pilot.

=== 2001–2009: Career expansion ===
During Charmed, Combs made an uncredited cameo appearance in Steven Soderbergh's Ocean's Eleven (2001), and starred opposite Charisma Carpenter in the romantic comedy film See Jane Date (2003), portraying the role of "a struggling actress whose career benefits from an affair with an A-list actor." In 2007, she starred in the Lifetime television film Point of Entry (also titled Panic Button) as Kathy Alden, a wife and mother of a single child whose family moves to a "beautiful and supposedly secure gated community after she's the victim of a violent house break-in." The following year, Combs signed a contract with Lifetime to produce and star in a series Mistresses, based on the British series of the same name. However, that version of the show never made it to air. (ABC later made a version featuring Combs's former Charmed co-star Alyssa Milano.)

=== 2010–present: Pretty Little Liars and beyond ===
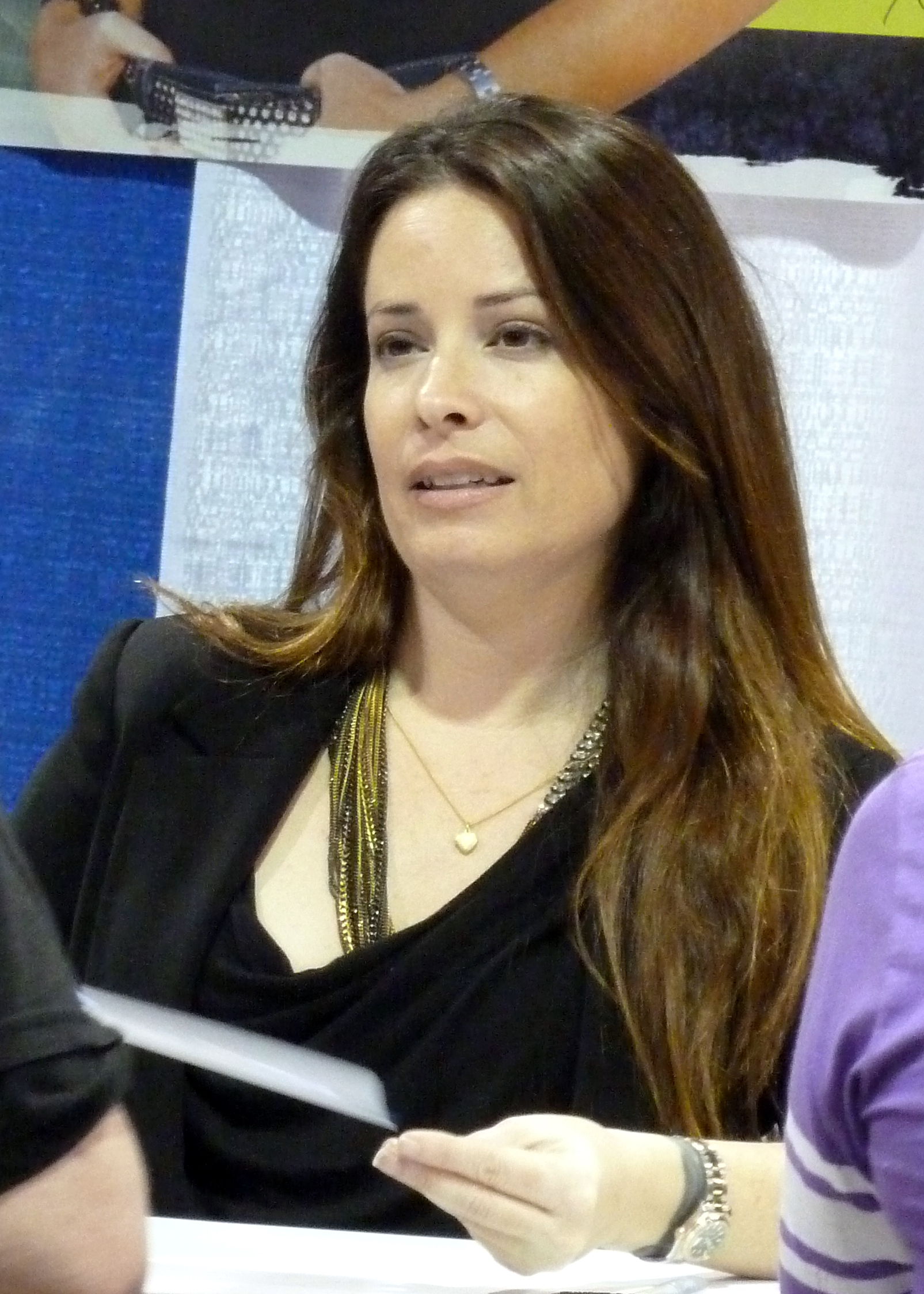
Combs in 2012

In 2010, Combs was cast in the Freeform series Pretty Little Liars as Ella Montgomery, the mother of one of the main characters, Aria Montgomery (played by Lucy Hale). Combs was a series regular for the first three seasons, but became credited as a special guest star from season four onwards. Pretty Little Liars ended after seven seasons, and Combs returned for the show's final episode on June 27, 2017.

Combs and Doherty starred in their own road trip reality show Off the Map with Shannen & Holly, which premiered on Great American Country on January 2, 2015. The six-episode series followed the pair traveling across southeastern United States, with stops in Kentucky, Tennessee, Mississippi, Alabama, Georgia and Florida. Viewers were able to vote on activities Doherty and Combs would partake in at each destination on Great American Country's official website. In January 2016, Combs starred in the Hallmark Channel television film Love's Complicated, playing the lead role of Leah Townsend, a big city novel writer and senator's daughter who is "known for being a people pleaser."

In 2026, during an episode of her podcast House of Halliwell, Combs said that she is retired from acting, and is focusing on her restaurants and family.

== Personal life ==
In 1993, Combs married actor Bryan Travis Smith; they divorced in 1997.

On February 14, 2004, she married her long time boyfriend and the former Charmed key-grip David Donoho. They have three sons together. In November 2011, she filed for divorce from Donoho, citing irreconcilable differences.

In 2016, Combs began dating restaurateur Mike Ryan. On September 3, 2017, Combs announced their engagement. On September 7, 2019, it was reported that they married in Carmel, California. Through this marriage, Combs has one stepdaughter.

== Filmography ==
=== Film ===
| Year | Title | Role | Notes |
|---|---|---|---|
| 1985 | Walls of Glass | Abby Hall | Classmate |
| 1988 | Sweet Hearts Dance | Dens Boon | |
| 1989 | New York Stories | Helena | Costume Party Girl |
| 1989 | Born on the Fourth of July | Jenny Turner | |
| 1991 | Nobody Can Hear You Scream | Melinda Ashwood | |
| 1992 | Simple Men | Kim Fields | |
| 1992 | Dr. Giggles | Jennifer Campbell | Lead role |
| 1992 | Chain of Desire | Diana Richards | |
| 1995 | A Reason to Believe | Sharon Digby | |
| 1995 | Evil in the Basement | Karen Ford | |
| 2001 | Ocean's Eleven | Poker Player | Cameo |
| 2022 | Corky | Herself | Narrator |

=== Television ===
| Year | Title | Role | Notes |
|---|---|---|---|
| 1990 | Guiding Light | Louisa Young | 2 episodes |
| 1991–1994 | As the World Turns | Denise Jones | 5 episodes |
| 1992–1996 | Picket Fences | Kimberly Brock | Main role |
| 1994 | A Perfect Stranger | Amanda Hale | Television movie |
| 1994 | Island City | Erin Sloan | Television movie |
| 1996 | Sins of Silence | Sophie DiMatteo | Television movie |
| 1997 | Love's Deadly Triangle: The Texas Cadet Murder | Diane Zamora | Television movie |
| 1997 | Our Mother's Murder | Alex Morell | Television movie |
| 1997 | Relativity | Anne Pryce | Episode: "Billable Hours" |
| 1998–2006 | Charmed | Piper Halliwell | Main role 179 episodes Producer (seasons 5–8) |
| 2003 | See Jane Date | Natasha Nutley | Television movie |
| 2007 | Panic Button (original title Point of Entry) | Katherine Alden | Television movie |
| 2010–2017 | Pretty Little Liars | Ella Montgomery | Main cast (seasons 1–3); Special guest star (seasons 4–7) |
| 2016 | Love's Complicated | Leah Townsend | Television movie |
| 2019 | Grey's Anatomy | Heidi Peterson | Episode: "Reunited" |

==== Reality TV Shows ====
| Year | Title | Role | Notes |
|---|---|---|---|
| 2014 | Hell's Kitchen | Herself | Season 12 Episode 6: "15 Chefs Compete"; Blue kitchen VIP guest |
| 2015 | Off the Map with Shannen & Holly | Herself | Great American Country reality series (6 episodes) |

=== Internet ===
| Year | Title | Role | Notes |
|---|---|---|---|
| 2020 | Pretty Little Wine Moms Re-Watch | Herself | Episode: "The Pilot" |
| 2020 | Homeward Bound: Surviving the Coronavirus | Herself | Episode: "Wet Suits, Mary Poppins and Pretty Little Wine Moms" |
| 2022–2023 | House of Halliwell | Herself | Podcaster. Lead role |
| 2023 | Let's Be Clear with Shannen Doherty | Herself | 2 Episodes |
| 2024–present | House of Halliwell | Herself | Podcaster. Lead role |

=== Producer ===
| Year | Title | Role | Notes |
|---|---|---|---|
| 2002–06 | Charmed | Producer | 90 episodes |
| 2008 | Zack's Life | Executive producer | |
| 2009 | Mistresses | Co-producer | Television film |
| 2011 | Summer of Love | Executive producer | |
| 2012 | "Naked in Venice" | Producer | Music video by Radical Something |
| 2014 | "You Feel Amazing" | Producer | Music video by Radical Something |
| 2014 | "Pure" | Producer | Music video by Radical Something |
| 2015 | Off the Map with Shannen & Holly | Executive producer | Episode: "Kentucky Bourbon & Broncos" |
| 2016 | Why Just One? | Associate producer | Documentary |
| 2018 | Sharkwater Extinction | Producer | Documentary |

== Awards and nominations ==
| Year | Association | Category | Title of work | Result | Ref. |
|---|---|---|---|---|---|
| 1993 | Young Artist Awards | Best Young Actress in a New Television Series | Picket Fences | Won | |
| 1994 | Young Artist Awards | Outstanding Youth Ensemble in a Television Series | Picket Fences | Nominated | |
| 1995 | Young Artist Awards | Best Performance by a Youth Actress in a TV Mini-Series or Special | A Perfect Stranger | Nominated | |
| 1995 | Screen Actors Guild Awards | Outstanding Performance by an Ensemble in a Drama Series | Picket Fences | Nominated | |
| 2001 | RATTY Awards | Outstanding Ensemble in a Science Fiction Series | Charmed | Nominated | |
| 2001 | RATTY Awards | Outstanding Lead Actress in a Science Fiction Series | Charmed | Nominated | |
| 2002 | RATTY Awards | Best Science Fiction Lead Actress | Charmed | Nominated | |
| 2003 | RATTY Awards | Best Science Fiction Lead Actress | Charmed | Won | |
| 2007 | AOL TV | Top TV Witches (Piper Halliwell) | Charmed | 3rd | |
| 2008 | AOL TV | Top TV Witches (Piper Halliwell) | Charmed | 3rd | |
| 2011 | E! Online | Top 10 Most Bitchin' Witches (Piper Halliwell) | Charmed | 6th | |
| 2016 | The Huffington Post | Top 10 Greatest Witches of All Time (Piper Halliwell) | Charmed | 6th | |
