= Charmed season 7 =

Season of television series

Charmed
- Season 7
- DVD cover
- Starring: Alyssa Milano; Rose McGowan; Holly Marie Combs; Brian Krause; Dorian Gregory
- No. of episodes: 22

Release
- Original network: The WB
- Original release: September 12, 2004 – May 22, 2005

Season chronology
- ← Previous; Season 6 Next → Season 8

The seventh season of Charmed, an American supernatural drama television series created by Constance M. Burge, premiered in the United States on The WB from September 12, 2004 through May 22, 2005. Airing on Sundays at 8:00 pm. Paramount Home Entertainment released the complete seventh season in a six-disc box set on February 2, 2007. It was later released on high-definition blu-ray on October 26, 2021.

== Cast and characters ==
=== Main ===
- Alyssa Milano as Phoebe Halliwell
- Rose McGowan as Paige Matthews
- Holly Marie Combs as Piper Halliwell
- Brian Krause as Leo Wyatt
- Dorian Gregory as Darryl Morris (Note: Only credited for the episodes he appears in.)

=== Recurring ===
- Jennifer Rhodes as Penny Halliwell
- James Read as Victor Bennett
- Rebecca Balding as Elise Rothman
- Sandra Prosper as Sheila Morris
- Jenya Lano as Inspector Sheridan
- Nick Lachey as Leslie St. Clair
- Elizabeth Dennehy as Sandra
- John de Lancie as Odin
- Charisma Carpenter as Kyra
- Kerr Smith as Kyle Brody
- Joel Swetow as Alpha
- Patrice Fisher as Beta
- Ian Anthony Dale as Gamma
- Oded Fehr as Zankou
- Max Perlich as Laygan
- Billy Zane as Drake dè Mon

=== Guest ===
- James Avery as Zola
- Billy Drago as Barbas, the Demon of Fear
- Finola Hughes as Patty Halliwell
- Harve Presnell as Captain Black Jack Cutting
- Simon Templeman as The Angel of Death
- T.J. Thyne as Danny
- Drew Fuller as Chris Halliwell
- Wes Ramsey as Wyatt Halliwell
- Bug Hall as Eddie Mullen
- Ann Cusack as Miss Donovan
- Chris Diamantopoulos as Davis
- Kevin Alejandro as Malvoc
- Corey Stoll as Demon
- Jon Hamm as Jack Brody
- Anne Dudek as Denise
- David Anders as Count Roget
- Julian McMahon as Cole Turner
- Don Swayze as Lucius
- Seamus Dever as Mitchell Haines
- John Kassir as Alchemist
- Keith Diamond as Reece Davidson
- Glenn Morshower as Agent Keyes
- Danneel Harris as Glamoured Paige Matthews
- Becki Newton as Glamoured Piper Halliwell
- Danielle Savre as Glamoured Phoebe Halliwell

=== Special Musical Guest ===
- The Donnas
- Collective Soul

== Episodes ==
No. overall	No. in season	Title	Directed by	Written by	Original release date	Prod. code	U.S. viewers (millions)
135	1	"A Call to Arms"	James L. Conway	Brad Kern	September 12, 2004	62015-07-135	5.59
Reeling from the loss of their future son Chris, an overprotective Piper and an obsessed Leo are forced by Phoebe and Paige to attend a Hindu wedding, where they inadvertently receive the powers of the Hindu's Ultimate Lovers, Shakti, the Goddess of Creation and her lover, Shiva, the God of Destruction. Phoebe and Paige must keep them from consummating their obvious new passion or according to Hindu dogma and legend, the world will be destroyed if they love one another again. Meanwhile, Barbas hatches a plot to distract Piper and Leo, well aware that Leo is hunting him and enlists a horde of lesser demons to kidnap baby Chris. Paige finds that the remaining staff at Magic School is packing up in preparation for shutting down, and resolves to take action for it to remain open. Phoebe meets her ghost writer at the Bay Mirror and discovers that Leslie is a guy. Back at the manor, Inspector Sheridan and a reluctant Darryl Morris confront Leo and Paige in the nursery and Leo blasts her across the room knocking her unconscious then leaves. Barbas proves able to influence Leo and uses projective telepathy to implant beliefs and causes him to attack an elder who is actually on his side.
136	2	"The Bare Witch Project"	John T. Kretchmer	Jeannine Renshaw	September 19, 2004	62015-07-136	4.84
Paige almost loses her fight to save Magic School when a bored student accidentally conjures Lady Godiva and Lord Dyson, a demonic land baron who feeds off repressed emotions. In the past, due to Godiva's ride, he was starved of repressed feelings and died of starvation, but bringing him to the present allows him to gain power. Paige has to send them back, or it would change the history as it is known. A new power starts to contact Leo, who believes he is losing his mind. They manage to send the two back, but change history as being in the present made Dyson powerful enough to kill Lady Godiva before her ride and change history. The Charmed Ones manage to summon the two again and try to vanquish Dyson, figuring if he is vanquished Godiva can be sent back alone. Finally, they succeed by having him feed off of Leo's repressed anger which overloads him and vanquishes him. Paige has the student that first summoned Godiva send her back and is able to prove to the Elders that they should keep Magic School open. In turn, they make her the new Headmistress.
137	3	"Cheaper by the Coven"	Derek Johansen	Mark Wilding	September 26, 2004	62015-07-137	5.37
Against Piper's wishes, Paige and Phoebe summon Grams for Chris' wiccaning that will protect him from evil while he grows. However, Wyatt gets attacked in the nursery by a masked demon that Leo begins pursuing with single-minded abandon and resolve. Meanwhile, Wyatt feels threatened that his younger brother is getting all of the attention and uses magic on him. In order to prevent sibling rivalry, Grams casts a spell on Wyatt and Chris, but inadvertently makes the sisters act like teenagers again. The Charmed Ones father, Victor, comes to the house and he decides to summon Patty to help him reverse the spell.
138	4	"Charrrmed!"	Mel Damski	Cameron Litvack	October 3, 2004	62015-07-138	4.77
On a search to find witches who have been disappearing, Paige encounters Captain Black Jack Cutting, an infamous 18th century pirate who is searching for the Fountain of Youth to reverse a curse. FBI agent Kyle Brody helps Darryl and Inspector Sheridan to find the Charmed Ones.
139	5	"Styx Feet Under"	Christopher Leitch	Henry Alonso Myers	October 10, 2004	62015-07-139	4.81
When a demon, Sirk, tries to destroy his human half by killing off his remaining blood relatives, Paige casts a spell that inadvertently blocks all death from occurring. Annoyed that he now has a backlog of work, the Angel of Death insists that the Charmed Ones help him clean up the mess and "kills" Piper so she can help him restore the Grand Design. Meanwhile, Phoebe earns back her power of premonition.
140	6	"Once in a Blue Moon"	John T. Kretchmer	Debra J. Fisher & Erica Messer	October 17, 2004	62015-07-140	4.63
The Elders' suspicion of Leo causes them to assign a new Whitelighter to the Charmed Ones. However, when the new Whitelighter is nearly killed by beasts, the Elders blame the attack on Leo. Trying to prove Leo's innocence, Piper, Phoebe, and Paige discover that the beasts are actually themselves, transformed by the blue moon. Kyle tells Paige his story in reference to the new power. And the sisters, after seeing the floating heads themselves, believe that Leo is not so crazy after all.
141	7	"Someone to Witch Over Me"	Jon Paré	Rob Wright	October 31, 2004	62015-07-141	3.96
Kyle convinces Paige to help him solve a mysterious string of accidents, only to discover that the demon Sarpedon is capturing innocents' Guardian Angels and using them to protect himself from the forthcoming threat of the Avatars. Consequently, Paige's Guardian is captured by the demon and she becomes accident prone. Meanwhile, Piper and Phoebe convince Leo to go on a vision quest in an attempt to come to grip with the visions and visitations he has been experiencing. He resists the arguments and blandishments of Avatars Alpha and Gamma, who appear to reason with him during the vision quest. Back at the manor, Sarpedon gets a drop on the sisters and a battle ensues where Piper and Phoebe die. In order to bring Piper and Phoebe back to life, Leo agrees with and becomes an Avatar.
142	8	"Charmed Noir"	Michael Grossman	Curtis Kheel	November 14, 2004	62015-07-142	3.94
While investigating a murder at Magic School, Paige and Kyle are sucked into an unfinished novel written twenty years ago by two students. They suddenly find themselves in a 1930s film noir, where gangsters in pursuit of the famed Burmese Falcon chase them. It is up to Piper, Phoebe, and Leo to save them. Meanwhile, Phoebe plays matchmaker between Leo and Piper.
143	9	"There's Something About Leo"	Derek Johansen	Natalie Antoci & Scott Lipsey	November 21, 2004	62015-07-143	3.95
Leo reveals to Piper that he is an Avatar, despite the warnings from Alpha and Beta that Piper should find out in her own time. A huge disaster ensues as Leo tells Piper just as she is adding touchy ingredients to a potion cauldron, which then blows up. Leo inadvertently rewinds time, and Alpha and Beta appear at that moment and freeze subjective time. In a frozen interval he is taken to task by Alpha and Beta and once again they attempt to dissuade him from revealing he is become an avatar to Piper. He stubbornly maintains Piper will be able to handle it. All three sisters have some trouble with the news leading to Phoebe and Paige calling on Kyle for help, but his reaction to the news causes disastrous results. The Avatars take Leo to task but allow time to be rewound to before Leo tells Piper.
144	10	"Witchness Protection"	David Jackson	Jeannine Renshaw	November 28, 2004	62015-07-144	4.17
The Avatars insist that Leo protect Kyra, a seer, because she has information that can help them destroy the demons and help the sisters reconcile themselves to the Avatars. Kyra shares with Phoebe a vision of a future in which there are no demons, leading the sisters to consider the possibility that the Avatars might be good and allowing Leo the opportunity to admit he is an Avatar. Kyle and Paige find themselves in opposition to Leo, Piper, and Phoebe. Zankou is released by a congregation of lesser demons fearing the Avatars and the sisters. Zankou invades the manor and kills Kyra.
145	11	"Ordinary Witches"	Jonathan West	Mark Wilding	January 16, 2005	62015-07-145	3.52
Still not completely sure that the Avatars mean well, Piper agrees to switch powers with Phoebe so that she too can see Phoebe's premonition of a Utopian world. During the spell, Zankou senses their vulnerability and attacks them, accidentally transferring their powers to innocent bystanders, Denise (Anne Dudek) and Ronny (Brian Howe). Paige shows Kyle that his parents, Jack and Ruth Brody (Jon Hamm and Jessica Steen) were not in fact killed by the Avatars, but by demons seeking the anti-Avatar potions. Meanwhile, Denise and Ronny who have gained Piper and Phoebe's powers refuse to co-operate in giving back their new powers. Instead they decide that they'll use their powers to get back at Denise's cheating ex-husband, and win big money. With this plan they head off to gamble in Nevada refusing to obey what's asked of them. Later, Zankou outs Leo to the Elders who confront him, and he admits he is an Avatar, which leads to the Elders trying to kill Leo but fail. Meanwhile, Phoebe convinces Ronny by showing the vision of Utopia given to her by Kira and they return home to switch powers back. There, Zankou attacks, but leaves after Denise blasts him and he senses that Leo is still alive.
146	12	"Extreme Makeover: World Edition"	LeVar Burton	Cameron Litvack	January 23, 2005	62015-07-146	3.56
While the Avatars prepare to transform the world into a Utopia, the Charmed Ones work overtime eliminating demons as part of the alliance. Kyle remains skeptical and quarrels with Paige stimulating questions in which they inform the Charmed Ones that the human world must be put to sleep so that they can kill any remaining demons. Although Kyle now knows the Avatars didn't murder his parents, he still doubts their good intentions. He calls the Elders for help but is instead kidnapped by Zankou. In order to convince Kyle to help him stop the Avatars, Zankou summons and vanquishes the demons who murdered Kyle's parents. In return, Kyle reluctantly agrees to help Zankou stop the change by placing a paranoia spell on Piper, Phoebe and Paige. During the Utopian transformation, Kyle uses Paige's paranoia to lure and kill an Avatar. However, he pays a high price for his actions as he's killed by Beta as he kills her. As a result of his death, the Avatars include the Charmed Ones in the sleep spell so they can't interfere.
147	13	"Charmageddon"	John T. Kretchmer	Henry Alonso Myers	January 30, 2005	62015-07-147	3.97
While the Charmed Ones enjoy their new conflict-free world, Leo learns that in order for the Avatars to protect their Utopian world, they also control everyone's destiny by deciding who lives and dies. Wanting to stop the Avatars, Leo joins forces with Zankou to undo the change. Paige receives a special surprise and Leo's fate relies on the Elders. In the end, Leo's death shocks the sisters back to reality and they team up with Zankou to stop the Avatars. Using information that Zankou found in an ancient tomb, they make the Avatar killing potion and confront the Avatars with it. The Avatars, realizing that humanity is not ready for them yet, use the last of their power to rewind time to when Utopia started. Doing so breaks the Utopia spell and returns all those killed by the Avatars, including Leo who is stripped of his Avatar powers, but still remains an Elder. The Avatars are too weak to rewind time far enough to save Kyle and Paige goes to his apartment where she is shocked to find him apparently alive. The Elders have made him a Whitelighter for his actions against the Avatars and he says a final goodbye to Paige, аnd flies into the sky.
148	14	"Carpe Demon"	Stuart Gillard	Curtis Kheel	February 13, 2005	62015-07-148	2.95
When Paige attempts to hire a new professor for Magic School, she learns that one of the candidates, Drake, is an ex-demon who made a deal with a demonic Sorcerer to become human.
149	15	"Show Ghouls"	Mel Damski	Rob Wright & Debra J. Fisher & Erica Messer	February 20, 2005	62015-07-149	3.23
When Darryl fears his friend Mike is possessed, Phoebe, Paige and Drake discover that Mike had been working close to a site where a cabaret was destroyed in a fire in 1899, killing hundreds of people. The spirit of one of the victims is using Mike to plead for help on behalf of all the Lost Souls who are trapped in the cabaret, forced to relive that night for eternity. Drake casts a spell to enter the cabaret where they learn that the Count who runs it made a pact with a demon named Sargon to cause this. The sisters learn they vanquished him five years before so they can't force him to undo it and the Count possesses Drake's body and leaves Phoebe and Drake to die in the cabaret. Phoebe manages to escape and the sisters cast the Count from Drake's body and he is dragged to hell. Drake returns to his own body and getting rid of the Count's spirit frees the other Lost Souls and they finally move on.
150	16	"The Seven Year Witch"	Michael Grossman	Jeannine Renshaw	April 10, 2005	62015-07-150	3.97
Already stressed out awaiting word on Leo's fate, Piper is attacked by demon assassins and ends up in a coma. Stuck in the cosmic void between life and death, Piper's spirit is surprised to find Cole's spirit waiting for her and even more surprised when he tells her that he is there to help keep her and Leo together, which he hopes will restore Phoebe's faith in love. Meanwhile, Leo is stripped of his powers and memory and put in the world somewhere as a test to see if he will remain an Elder or become human. The Elders cheat on the test and lead Leo to becoming an Elder again, but with Cole's help, Piper manages to reach out to Leo and he jumps off the Golden Gate Bridge and "falls from grace," becoming mortal again. Phoebe, Paige and Leo return home to find that Drake has had Wyatt use the healing powers he inherited from his father to heal Piper. Later, in Magic School, Drake says his goodbyes to Phoebe and heads off to die alone. There it is revealed that Drake has been working with Cole the whole time and it was Cole's spirit who set him up with the Sorcerer to become mortal. Cole's spirit is also the one who sent the assassins after Piper, but it was all part of a plot by Cole to get Phoebe to not give up on love. He sent Drake to Phoebe to remind her and like Cole, Drake fell in love with Phoebe which both admit isn't hard to do. Drake dies and moves on, while Cole is content with his afterlife as a spirit that can never move on due to his horrible deeds as he prevented Phoebe from having that fate.
151	17	"Scry Hard"	Derek Johansen	Andy Reaser & Doug E. Jones	April 17, 2005	62015-07-151	3.48
Zankou sends his underlings to attack Leo in hopes of luring the sisters out of their house so that he can search for the Nexus and release the Shadow, the ultimate power. Terrified after witnessing demons attack his parents, Wyatt magically shrinks Piper and Leo and traps them inside a dollhouse for their protection. Leo also becomes the new headmaster of magic school.
152	18	"Little Box of Horrors"	Jon Paré	Cameron Litvack	April 24, 2005	62015-07-152	3.92
The Charmed Ones are in a race against time when the mythological Pandora's Box falls into the hands of Katya, a shape shifting demon who intends to open the box and fill the world with all of the evils, illnesses, diseases, sorrows and toils contained within. Phoebe and Piper try to find Hope, the Guardian who can return any released evils to the box. Meanwhile, Paige's Whitelighter side starts to grow stronger and she is able to hear the Elder's call. At Leo and an Elder named Sandra's suggestion, Paige is sent to save a future Whitelighter and gets trapped in an elevator with people she has to save. She does so and returns home in time to help out. Using her new Whitelighter powers, Paige disguises herself as Hope and tricks Katya. Paige vanquishes her, saves Hope's friend Darcy and sends her home with Pandora's Box where Hope is able to return all of the sorrows to where they belong. Paige meets with Sandra who reveals that Paige herself was the future Whitelighter she was meant to save and says that Paige has proved she can handle Whitelighter duties as well as Charmed ones. Sandra tells her that being a Whitelighter can be very fulfilling for her and suggests to Paige that perhaps being a Whitelighter is the life separate from magic she was looking for.
153	19	"Freaky Phoebe"	Michael Grossman	Mark Wilding	May 1, 2005	62015-07-153	3.65
After a spell is cast on Phoebe by the 'ugliest' demon in the Underworld, beauty-hungry sorceress Imara, their souls switch bodies and Phoebe ends up becoming trapped in a cage. Paige is in quandary when her first charge (Seamus Dever) appears to be lost to the dark side. Then by accident The Charmed Ones vanquish Phoebe's soul. They realize that Imara was in Phoebe's body, so they vanquish Imara (but not Phoebe's body) and get back Phoebe's soul. In the end Phoebe is yelling at her sisters.
154	20	"Imaginary Fiends"	Jonathan West	Henry Alonso Myers	May 8, 2005	62015-07-154	3.32
Unbeknownst to the sisters, baby Wyatt's new "imaginary" friend is actually a demon named Vicus who is trying to win Wyatt's trust to turn him evil. Meanwhile, Piper casts a spell to be able to understand baby Wyatt, but inadvertently brings 25-year-old Wyatt back from the future.
155	21	"Death Becomes Them"	John T. Kretchmer	Curtis Kheel	May 15, 2005	62015-07-155	3.44
Zankou's plan to make the sisters vulnerable so that he can take control of the Book of Shadows starts to work when Phoebe is left guilt-ridden after a classmate is brutally killed in front of her and comes back from the dead to blame her. Also part of Zankou's plan, Paige is devastated when she finds her new charge dead and realizes she was powerless to save her.
156	22	"Something Wicca This Way Goes...?"	James L. Conway	Story by : Rob Wright & Brad Kern; Teleplay by : Brad Kern	May 22, 2005	62015-07-156	3.44
With the Book of Shadows finally in his possession, Zankou plans to open the Spiritual Nexus and take in the power of the Shadow. To divert Zankou's attention away from the Nexus, Piper, Phoebe and Paige successfully goad him into coming after them instead. The sisters come to the realization that the only way to stop Zankou may be to sacrifice themselves, but they manage to survive and escape with Leo in an attempt to get their lives back.
