= List of Charmed characters =

The lead characters of seasons 1–3. From left to right: Phoebe (Alyssa Milano), Prue (Shannen Doherty) and Piper (Holly Marie Combs).

The lead characters of seasons 4–8. From left to right: Phoebe, Piper and Paige (Rose McGowan).

Charmed is an American television series that was originally broadcast by The WB for eight seasons from October 7, 1998, until May 21, 2006. The series narrative follows a trio of sisters, known as the Charmed Ones, the most powerful good witches of all time, who use their combined Power of Three to protect innocent lives from evil beings such as demons and warlocks. Each sister possesses unique magical powers that grow and evolve, while they attempt to maintain normal lives in modern-day San Francisco. The main characters of the first three seasons were Prue (Shannen Doherty), Piper (Holly Marie Combs) and Phoebe Halliwell (Alyssa Milano). After Doherty departed from the series in 2001, resulting in her character's death, she was replaced by Rose McGowan as the long-lost younger half-sister Paige Matthews from the fourth season onwards. The following list only contains characters that appeared in five or more episodes.

== Cast ==
Main cast ("Starring" in opening credits)
Recurring cast (3+ episodes)
Guest cast (1–2 episodes)

Actor	Character	Seasons							
Actor	Character	1	2	3	4	5	6	7	8
Main cast members
Shannen Doherty	Prue Halliwell	Main	Main	Main		Stand-in			
Holly Marie Combs	Piper Halliwell	Main	Main	Main	Main	Main	Main	Main	Main
Alyssa Milano	Phoebe Halliwell	Main	Main	Main	Main	Main	Main	Main	Main
Rose McGowan	Paige Matthews				Main	Main	Main	Main	Main
T.W. King	Andy Trudeau	Main							
Dorian Gregory	Darryl Morris	Main (Note: Included in the opening credits only when they appear.)	Main	Main	Main	Main	Main	Main	
Greg Vaughan	Dan Gordon		Main						
Karis Paige Bryant	Jenny Gordon		Main (Note: Bryant departs after "That Old Black Magic" (ep. 2.6).)						
Brian Krause	Leo Wyatt	Recurring	Main (Note: Krause is initially recurring, before being added to the opening credits from "Pardon My Past" (ep. 2.14).)	Main	Main	Main	Main	Main	Main
Julian McMahon (Note: Cole's demonic form, Belthazar, is portrayed by Michael Bailey Smith.)	Cole Turner			Main	Main	Main		Guest	
Drew Fuller (Note: As a child, Chris is also portrayed by several uncredited infant actors.)	Chris Halliwell					Guest	Main	Recurring	Recurring
Kaley Cuoco	Billie Jenkins								Main
Recurring cast members
Neil Roberts	Rex Buckland	Recurring							
Leigh-Allyn Baker	Hannah Webster	Recurring							
Cristine Rose	Claire Pryce	Recurring							
Finola Hughes	Patty Halliwell	Recurring (Note: Originally portrayed by Alyssa Milano and an uncredited actress in the character's first two episodes.)	Guest	Guest	Guest	Guest		Guest	Guest
Jennifer Rhodes	Penny Halliwell	Guest	Guest	Recurring	Guest	Recurring	Guest	Guest	Guest
James Read	Victor Bennett	Guest (Note: Originally portrayed by Anthony Denison in the character's first episode.)		Recurring	Guest	Guest	Guest	Guest	Recurring
Billy Drago	Barbas	Guest	Guest			Guest	Recurring	Guest	
Lochlyn Munro	Jack Sheridan		Recurring						
Keith Diamond	Inspector Reece Davidson			Recurring				Guest	
Peter Woodward (Note: Initially played by Michael Bailey Smith in season three, and Bennet Guillory at the beginning of season four.)	The Source			Guest	Recurring				Guest
Debbi Morgan	The Seer				Recurring	Guest			
David Reivers	Bob Cowan				Recurring	Guest			
Rebecca Balding (Note: Balding also plays Aunt Jackie in the first season.)	Elise Rothman				Guest	Recurring	Recurring	Recurring	Recurring
Jason and Kristopher Simmons (Note: In seasons six to eight, the adult version of Wyatt is portrayed by Wes Ramsey.)	Wyatt Halliwell					Recurring	Recurring	Recurring	Recurring
Eric Dane	Jason Dean					Recurring	Recurring		
Sandra Prosper	Sheila Morris					Recurring	Recurring	Recurring	
Joel Swetow	Avatar Alpha					Guest		Recurring	
Jenya Lano	Inspector Sheridan						Recurring	Recurring	
Gildart Jackson	Gideon						Recurring		
Balthazar Getty	Richard Montana						Recurring		
Chrisma Carpenter	Kyra							Recurring	
Kerr Smith	Kyle Brody							Recurring	
Oded Fehr	Zankou							Recurring	
Nick Lachey	Lesley St. Claire							Recurring	
Patrice Fisher	Avatar Beta							Recurring	
Ian Anthony Dale	Avatar Gamma							Recurring	
Billy Zane	Drake dè Mon							Recurring	
Jason Lewis	Dex Lawson								Recurring
Marnette Patterson	Christy Jenkins								Recurring
Ivan Sergei	Henry Mitchell								Recurring
Victor Webster	Coop								Recurring

Cast notes

== Main characters ==
=== Prue Halliwell ===
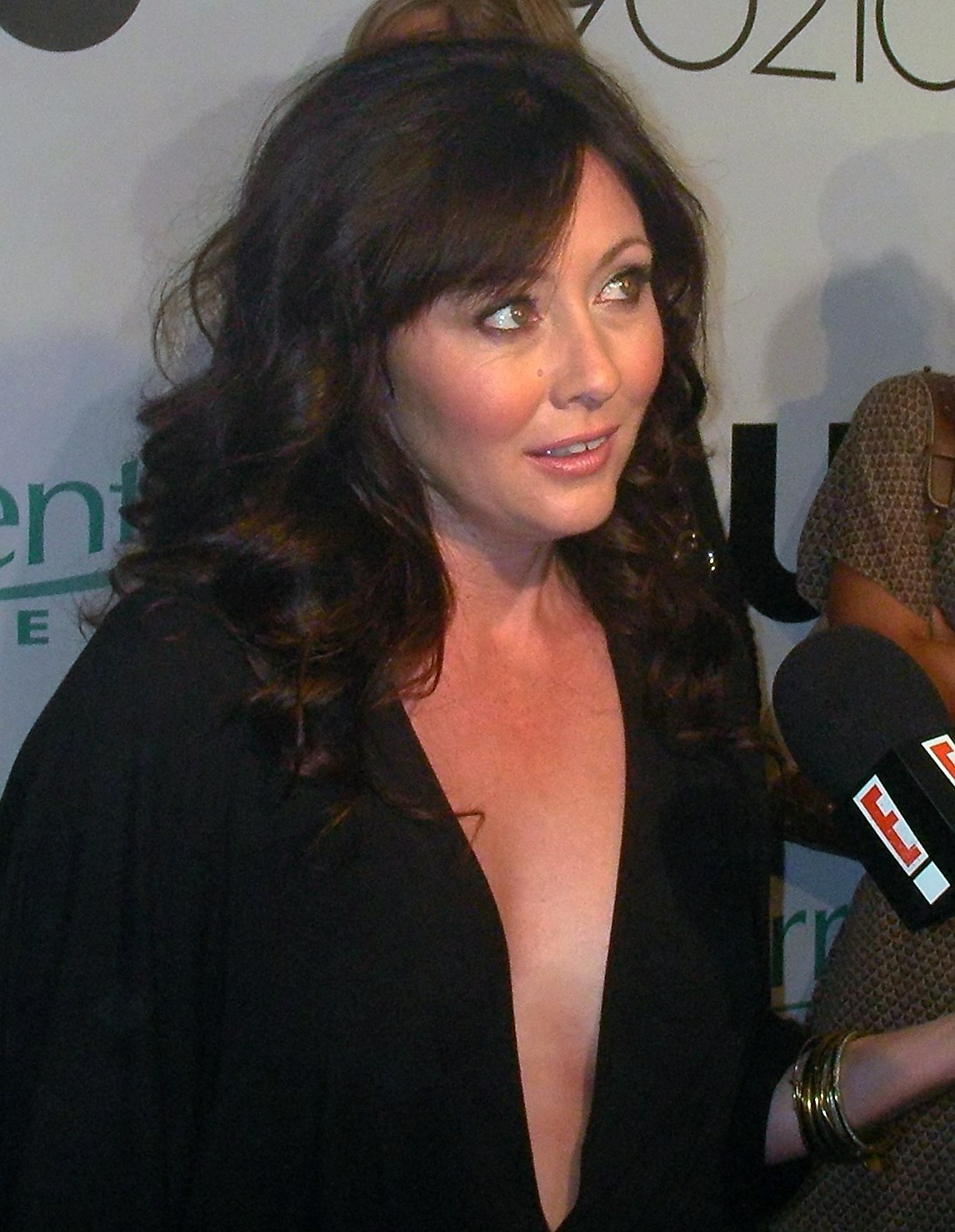
Shannen Doherty

Prudence "Prue" Halliwell (played by Shannen Doherty) is the eldest sister who initially receives the power to move objects with her mind by channeling telekinesis through her eyes. As the series progresses, Prue channels her telekinetic powers through her hands, and also gains the power of astral projection, which allows her to materialize her astral form outside of her body. Prue also develops martial arts skills and becomes an effective hand-to-hand fighter. She sacrificed a majority of her childhood to help raise her two younger sisters Piper and Phoebe, after the death of their mother and the abandonment of their father. Prue's sense of responsibility occasionally leads to clashes with the more free-spirited Phoebe, however, the two grow closer as the series progresses. During her three seasons on Charmed, Prue is regarded as the strongest and most powerful witch of the Halliwell sisters, as she usually takes charge of situations that involve demons and warlocks. In the season three finale, Prue is killed by Shax, a powerful demonic assassin sent by The Source of All Evil (Michael Bailey Smith).

=== Piper Halliwell ===
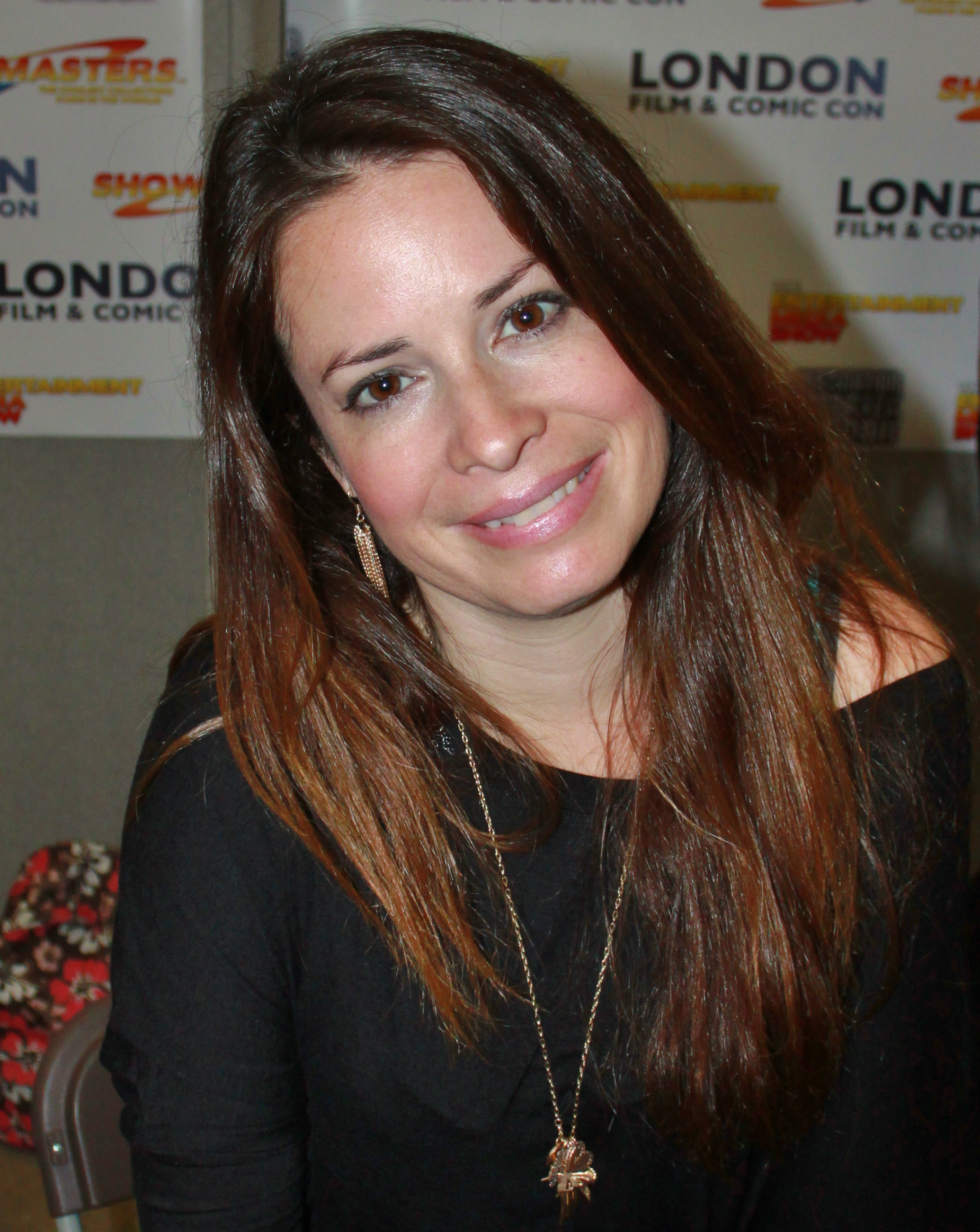
Holly Marie Combs

Piper Halliwell (played by Holly Marie Combs) is the second eldest sister who initially receives the power of molecular immobilization, which allows her to "freeze" her surrounding environment. As the series progresses, she also gains the power of molecular combustion, which enables her to combust any object she wishes; this power quickly becomes useful to easily vanquish lower level demons. Piper starts off as the middle sister, but later becomes the eldest after Prue dies. Piper is initially shy and submissive, but gradually develops a much more assertive personality, especially after Prue's death. One of the reoccurring struggles for Piper is her attempt to maintain a normal life despite her destiny of defeating the forces of evil. In season three, she marries their whitelighter Leo and as the series progresses, they have three children; Wyatt (born in season five), Chris (born in season six) and Melinda Halliwell.

=== Phoebe Halliwell ===
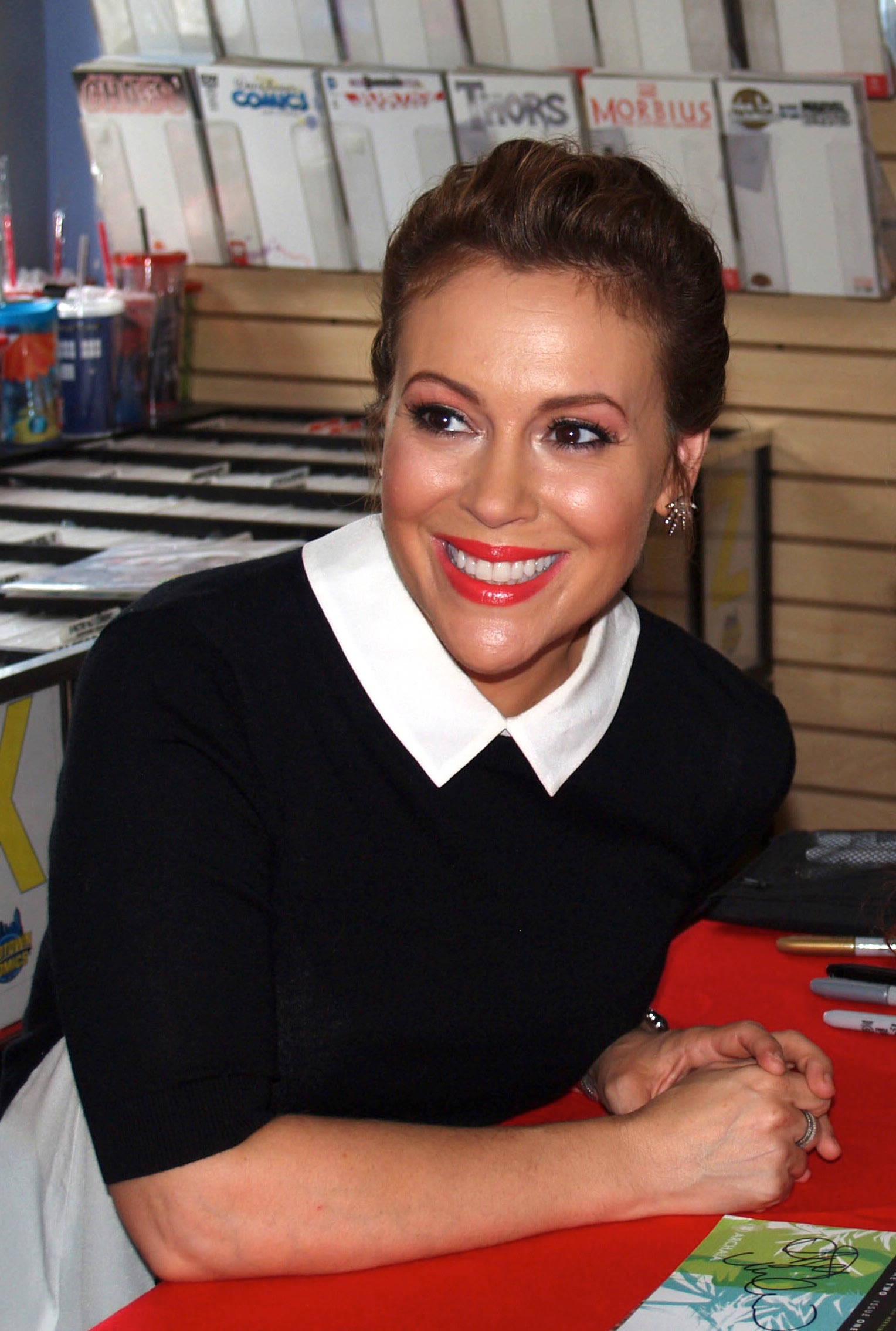
Alyssa Milano

Phoebe Halliwell (played by Alyssa Milano) is the third sister who initially receives the power of premonition, which enables her to see into the past or the future. To make up for initially receiving a passive power, Phoebe develops martial arts skills to better assist her sisters when fighting evil. As the series progresses, she also gains the active powers of levitation and empathy and her premonitions become more powerful, enabling her to communicate with people in the future and share with other people. Phoebe starts out as the youngest and most rebellious of the sisters. Because of her free-spirited nature, she often comes into major conflicts with Prue but the two eventually mend their relationship. She later becomes the middle sister after Prue dies and the series introduces their younger half-sister Paige. One of the recurring struggles for Phoebe is her attempt to find a career and true love. In the final season she falls in love and marries Coop, a cupid that was initially sent to restore her faith in love and to find love.

=== Paige Matthews ===
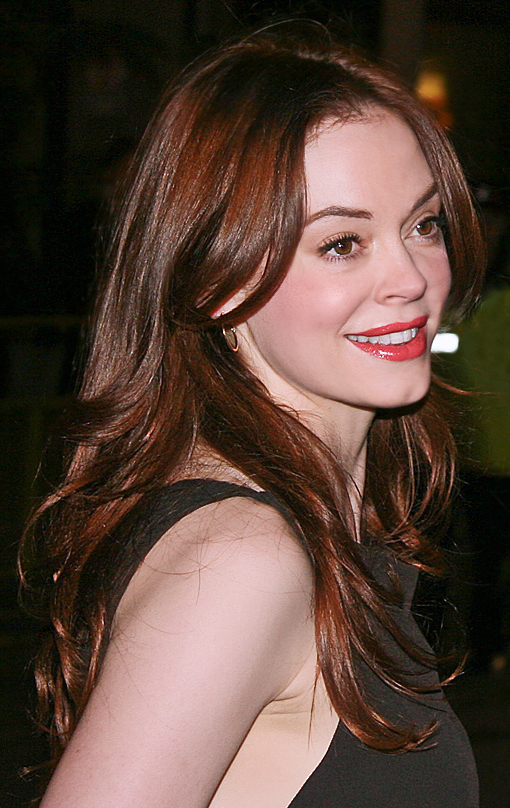
Rose McGowan

Paige Matthews (née Halliwell) (played by Rose McGowan) is the youngest half-sister who initially receives the power to move objects with her mind by orbing ("teleporting") them from one location to another through a vocal command. Paige is ambitious, outspoken, and stands firmly in what she believes in. She is the secret love child of the Halliwell sisters' mother and her whitelighter, making Paige both a witch and whitelighter. Paige was given up at birth and raised by her adoptive parents. She was unaware of her magical history until Prue's funeral at the beginning of season four, in which she goes on to help reconstitute The Charmed Ones by taking Prue's place in the Power of Three. Her main power is telekinetic orbing: a combination of the prophesied telekinetic power as a Charmed sister and her own whitelighter DNA. As the series progresses, Paige also inherits a variety of whitelighter powers such as orbing herself and others, sensing, glamouring and healing. One of the recurring struggles for Paige is finding an identity for herself outside of her role as a Charmed One. In the final season, she marries parole officer, Henry.

== Supporting characters ==
=== Andy Trudeau ===
Andrew "Andy" Trudeau (played by Ted King) is a detective for the San Francisco Police Department. He was introduced in season one as the Halliwell sisters' childhood friend, and Prue's high school sweetheart and first love. Andy is coincidentally assigned to almost every police case that involve the sisters. He eventually discovers that they are witches and serves as the sisters' initial connection to the police force. He works with Darryl as his partner, although he causes quite a bit of grief to Darryl by always being seemingly ahead of his partner. In the season one finale, Andy is killed by the demon Rodriguez (Carlos Gomez), who also happens to be one of the Internal Affairs officers that was investigating Andy's unsolved cases.

=== Darryl Morris ===
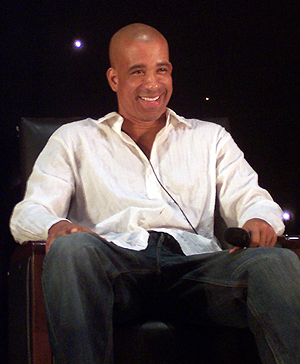
Dorian Gregory (pictured) portrayed Darryl Morris between seasons one and seven.

Darryl Morris (played by Dorian Gregory) is a lieutenant in the San Francisco Police Department. Darryl is introduced as the partner of Andy. At first, Darryl is suspicious of the sisters' recurring connection to mysterious murders and crimes. However, a few months after Andy's death, the sisters reveal to him that they are good witches trying to bring justice and protection to the world. Throughout the series, Darryl helps the sisters cover up unsolved cases related to demonic activity, grants them favors, and gives them general support. After season seven, Darryl and his family move to the East Coast.

=== Leo Wyatt ===
Leo Wyatt (played by Brian Krause) is the Halliwell sisters' whitelighter, a guardian angel for good witches—who has the powers to orb, heal, sense, glamour and hover. Leo is introduced into season one as the sisters' handyman who is hired to fix up their house, but they later discover that he is actually their whitelighter. Leo and Piper become romantically involved, eventually marrying and having children, but Leo's whitelighter duties often cause problems for his marriage to Piper and their family. Their relationship is the first of many conflicts between the Halliwells and The Elders.

=== Dan Gordon ===
Dan Gordon (played by Greg Vaughan) is a neighbor of the Halliwell sisters in the second season. In the first episode of the season, Dan moves into the house next-door to the sisters' with his niece Jenny. He was a baseball player who played second base for the Seattle Mariners until he blew out his knee sliding home, and he later became a construction worker. Dan and Piper start dating after Piper and Leo split up due to the strenuous nature his whitelighter duties place on their relationship. Dan doesn't know the sisters are witches and while dating Piper, he notices the oddity of the sisters' lives and often suspects that they are hiding something. Piper's sudden unexplained disappearances due to her duties as a good witch and her avoidance of his questions begins to frustrate Dan and make him feel uncomfortable in their relationship.

Piper later breaks up with Dan and reconciles with Leo. However, Dan becomes suspicious of Leo and asks his brother-in-law who works for the State Department to check out Leo's army records. When his brother-in-law discovers that the young looking Leo was a soldier many decades ago in World War II, and died, Dan shares this information with Piper and is shocked to find out that she already knew. In the second season finale, Dan learns the truth about Piper and her sisters, after a wish granted by a genie (French Stewart) from Piper that Dan could "move on" with his life, turns him into an old man. Piper is heartbroken when Dan tells her that he wished he never found out because it freaks him out. To help ease Dan's mind, Piper wishes for the genie to make him forget about learning the truth and for him to truly move on with his life, which leads to Dan moving to Portland, Oregon after accepting a job offer there.

=== Jenny Gordon ===
Jenny Gordon (played by Karis Paige Bryant) is Dan's niece who temporarily moves in with him for school because her parents are in Saudi Arabia on business. While living with her uncle, Jenny forms a bond with the sisters and often turns to them for advice on female issues that she is not comfortable talking to her uncle about. Midway through season two, Jenny moves back in with her parents after they return to the United States.

=== Cole Turner ===
Cole Turner (played by Julian McMahon), also known as the demonic assassin Belthazor, is a half-human and half-demon. Cole has the powers to teleport and throw projective energy balls which could stun or kill. He is introduced into season three as an Assistant District Attorney sent by The Triad to kill the Charmed Ones, but instead falls in love with Phoebe. Though Cole eventually rids himself of his demonic nature and marries Phoebe in season four, he later returns to evil after he unwillingly becomes the new Source of All Evil. This causes the sisters to kill him towards the end of season four. However, in season five Cole escapes The Wasteland, due to him stealing vast amounts of powers off other dead demons, and forces himself into the sisters' lives again. Cole never regains their trust and although he attempts to dedicate his new life to being good, Phoebe's rejection of his love drives him to the point of insanity, which again results in his demise.

=== Chris Halliwell ===
Christopher Perry Halliwell (played by Drew Fuller) is the second son of Leo and Piper, making him a half-witch and half whitelighter. Chris is introduced into the season five finale as a whitelighter from the future who helps assist the sisters against magical beings known as The Titans. While he successfully gains the Charmed Ones' trust, Leo remains initially suspicious. In season six, Chris reveals that he is actually Leo and Piper's son and that he traveled back in time to prevent his older brother Wyatt from growing up to be the evil dictator he becomes in the future. For this to happen, Chris set up a scheme where most of The Elders would die so that Leo could become an Elder and he could become the Charmed Ones' new whitelighter, allowing him to get close enough to Wyatt to protect him. In the season six finale, adult Chris is killed by an Elder named Gideon (Gildart Jackson) and baby Chris is born. His powers are telekinesis and orbing.

=== Billie Jenkins ===
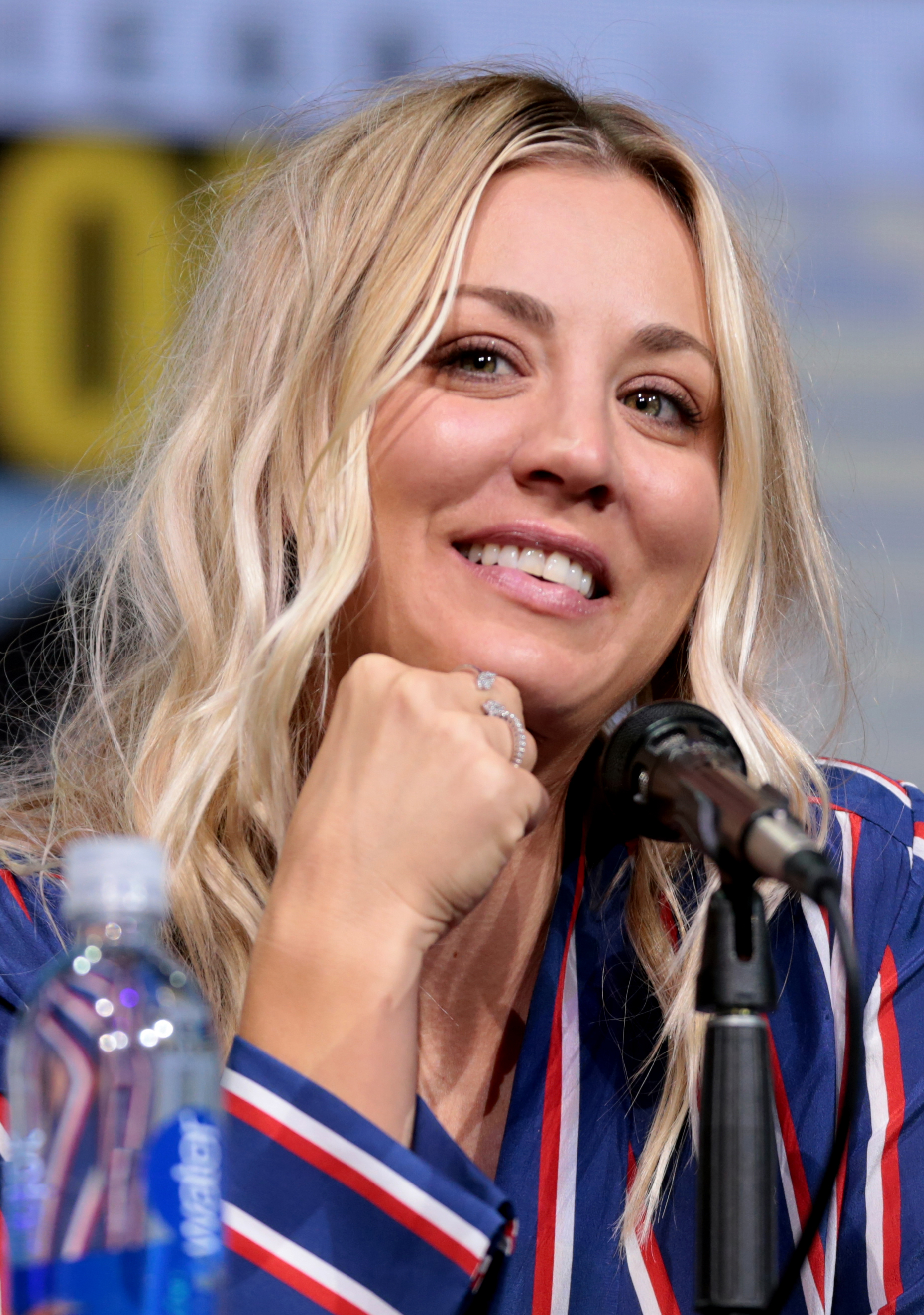
Kaley Cuoco

Billie Jenkins (played by Kaley Cuoco) is a young witch who has the power of projection and to move objects with her mind using telekinesis. Billie is introduced into season eight as a college student and a new charge for Paige. While the sisters assume new identities during the first few episodes of the season, she keeps their secret and does some of their magical legwork for them. Billie becomes obsessed with finding her long-lost older sister Christy, who was kidnapped 15 years earlier by The Triad. Billie is eventually reunited with her sister, but does not know that she has been turned evil under the influence of demons. After Christy briefly sways her to betray the Charmed Ones, Billie eventually sides with the sisters in the series finale and is forced to kill Christy in self-defense.

== Recurring characters ==
=== Rex Buckland and Hannah Webster ===
Rex Buckland (played by Neil Roberts) and Hannah Webster (played by Leigh-Allyn Baker) are both warlocks who are first introduced into season one after Prue applies for a job at Buckland's Auction House, where they both work. While Rex tests Prue's knowledge of art, Hannah "accidentally" pushes a stepladder, knocking over a bucket of paint right above Prue. When Prue deviates the paint's trajectory with her power, Hannah concludes she is "either the luckiest woman alive... or a witch." Hannah almost gives away her secret of being a witch after Prue casts a truth spell on herself, which forces everyone around her to say the truth, including Hannah who tells her "it's my mission in life to destroy you." Rex takes this as "office rivalry", and scolds her later. Hannah first shows her powers when she lights Rex's cigar with only her breath. After this, Rex puts the Halliwell sisters' ancestor Melinda Warren's (Tyler Layton) locket in front of Prue for her to see. When she opens it, a powerful warlock and Melinda's past lover Matthew Tate (Billy Wirth) emerges from the locket and tries to kill the Charmed Ones. However, the sisters resurrect Melinda, who imprisons him in the locket again. Rex and Hannah have Prue arrested for stealing a tiara by planting evidence on her and manipulating her into believing she killed an auction house security guard. When Piper and Phoebe help Prue to escape from prison, Rex takes a picture of them and threatens to expose them. Rex demands their powers and gives the sisters a jar to store them in. With their powers gone, the sisters give the jar back to Rex at the auction house. While the sisters face Rex and Hannah, Leo, who was believed to be a handyman, performs magic on the sisters' Book of Shadows and returns the powers to the girls. Just as Hannah is about to kill the sisters in her black panther form, Piper freezes her and Rex. Prue then uses her telekinesis powers to move Rex in front of Hannah and she accidentally kills him. Having done so, Hannah reverts to her human form before being vanquished herself by an unknown force.

=== Victor Bennett ===
Victor Bennett, played by Anthony Denison (season one) and James Read (seasons three to eight), made his first appearance during the season one episode "Thank You for Not Morphing". He is the ex-husband of Patty and the father of Prue, Piper and Phoebe. After his divorce from Patty and her death, Victor left his daughters to be raised by their grandmother after constantly fighting with her about how to raise the girls. Victor reappears in his daughters' lives after they become witches and restores the relationship with his daughters.

In 1998, Victor appears in San Francisco not long after his daughters find out they are witches. Prue is suspicious of him but Piper and Phoebe are more open to seeing him. Victor admits he wanted to take the Book of Shadows to protect his daughters. He leaves them without a proper goodbye, instead leaving a home movie of Christmas with the girls when they were younger. Three years later, Victor comes to San Francisco for a job interview. While in town, he assists his daughters in helping capture the demon children and bring them to the Ice Cream Man's truck. Victor has an immediate distrust of Piper's fiancée Leo, once he finds out he is a whitelighter, as he believes that Patty's affair with her whitelighter Sam was one of the contributing factors to the end of their marriage. Victor eventually accepts Leo and Piper's relationship. Later in 2001, Victor returns for Prue's funeral. In 2002, he visits his daughters and introduces them to his new wife Doris Bennett (Cheryl Ladd), whom he met on a singles' cruise. Victor does not know that Doris is a demon and that she only married him so she could get closer to his daughters and steal Piper's baby, Wyatt. Doris stabs Victor in the abdomen, nearly killing him, before attempting to steal Wyatt. However, she is eventually vanquished.

In 2004, Victor meets Piper's second son Chris, who came from the future to save Wyatt from becoming evil. To Victor's surprise, Chris is excited to see him and he tells Victor that they have a very close relationship in the future. Later in 2004, Victor brings baby Chris back home after Wyatt orbed him to Victor's place, due to the two brothers having a sibling rivalry. When a temporarily resurrected Penny casts a spell that accidentally transfers Wyatt and Chris' rivalry into the sisters, Victor and Penny summon Patty to work out their issues. Patty and Victor ruminate on what kind of parents they would have been if they stayed married, and Patty lived to see the girls as teenagers. In 2005, when the sisters prepare to fight the demon Zankou, they leave Wyatt, Chris and the deeds to the manor and Piper's nightclub P3 with Victor, making him their official guardian in case they do not survive. After the sisters' temporarily fake their deaths, Victor still maintains his role as the boys' guardian. Wyatt and Chris later return to Piper after the sisters come out of hiding. In 2006, Piper leaves her sons with Victor again for protection, when the sisters prepare for a battle with Billie and Christy.

=== Patty Halliwell ===
Patricia "Patty" Halliwell, played by Finola Hughes, made her first appearance during the season one episode "From Fear to Eternity". She is the mother of Prue, Piper, Phoebe and Paige. Patty was married to Victor Bennett, which resulted in the three Halliwell daughters and then had a post-marital affair with her whitelighter, which resulted in her fourth daughter Paige. Patty kept her fourth pregnancy a secret because The Elders would not approve; Patty and Sam gave the baby up for adoption shortly after she gave birth. Patty was killed by a water demon on February 28, 1978, but her spirit occasionally visits her children. Like Piper, Patty had the power to freeze time, and she was briefly able to have premonitions while carrying Phoebe.

=== Barbas ===
Barbas (also known as The Demon of Fear), played by Billy Drago, made his first appearance during the season one episode "From Fear To Eternity". He has the ability to sense a person's greatest fear and uses it against them. Originally, Barbas could only appear on Earth for 24 hours once every 1300 years, on Friday the 13th. If he could kill 13 unmarried witches before midnight, then he would be able break free of The Underworld and walk the Earth for eternity. This later changed, as Barbas started appearing much more frequently in Charmed. The Charmed Ones have vanquished him four times throughout the course of series, all by overcoming their greatest fears and using spells and potions. However, Barbas has always found a way to come back and escape from purgatory. He is finally vanquished in the season seven episode "A Call To Arms".

=== Penny Halliwell ===
Penelope "Penny" Halliwell (also known to her family as Grams), played by Jennifer Rhodes, made her first appearance during the season one episode "Is There a Woogy in the House?" A powerful woman, Penny possesses the power of telekinesis and the skill with it to deflect or reflect many spells or powers used by evil adversaries. She also added many potions and spells to the Book of Shadows. After Patty died, Penny raised Prue, Piper and Phoebe on her own. She died of a heart attack six months before the events of the first season, but has appeared several times in the series as a spirit. In an alternate universe she married the source and has a daughter named Leah consuming the power of three being the next source and meeting Paige, Phoebe, and Piper.

=== Inspector Rodriguez ===
Inspector Rodriguez (portrayed by Carlos Gomez). Posing as an Internal Affairs agent, Rodriguez questions Andy Trudeau after he takes a murder weapon used by the ghost of a serial killer so Prue and Phoebe can stop him. Rodriguez says he is worried about the number of unsolved cases Trudeau and Darryl Morris seemingly abandoned and believes Andy is covering for someone. Continuing with his investigation, Rodriguez threatens Andy, who refuses to reveal who he is protecting and turns in his gun and shield. While spying on the two detectives, Rodriguez overhears Andy telling Darryl that he is covering for Prue Halliwell. Rodriguez then kills his partner with his powers, thus revealing his demonic nature. Continuing to try and root out the sisters, he frames his partner's murder on Andy, but Andy still refuses to expose the sisters. Feeling frustrated, Rodriguez teams up with the time-manipulating demon, Tempus (portrayed by David Carradine)(who appears to work for the Source). Each time Rodriguez fails to kill all three sisters, Tempus reverses time to give him another chance. Due to Phoebe's power of premonition, the girls eventually figure out what is going on and tie up Rodriguez, but not before Andy is killed trying to protect Prue and her sisters. Encouraged by Andy's spirit, Prue uses a spell to break the time loop, weakening Tempus and sending him back to the Underworld. Prue then unties Rodriguez and orders him to leave. He immediately fires an energy ball in a last-ditch effort to kill the sisters, but Prue, sensing his intentions, uses her power to redirect it back to him and Rodriguez is finally vanquished.

=== Jack Sheridan ===
Jack Sheridan, played by Lochlyn Munro, made his first appearance during the season two episode "That Old Black Magic". He was originally an Internet auctioneer. In "That Old Black Magic", when Prue was doing a live appraisal for an exquisite wand, Jack walks in and boldly offers to guarantee the owner Betty (Pamela Kosh) $1,000 in cash on the spot. The wand belonged to Tuatha (Brigid Brannagh), a powerful evil witch from the 18th century. After Tuatha's defeat, Prue meets Jack at P3 and gives the wand back to him, who notes the broken crystal and its reduced value, but buys Prue a drink to show no hard feelings. In "They're Everywhere", Jack convinces his twin brother Jeff to help check out Prue because he likes her. Prue tells Piper that Jack might be a warlock after she sees one of them in front of her at the coffee pot and the other reading a magazine at the newsstand. Prue and Piper then cast a spell to hear his private thoughts. When both Sheridans appear in Prue's office, Jack tells her that Jeff is his twin brother.

In "P3 H2O", Jack accepts a job at Bucklands Auction House and helps Prue close a sale with Japanese client Mr. Fujimoto, while she was out demon hunting at a campsite. When Prue returns to her office, she is surprised to find out that Jack listed her as the sales agent. She then offers Jack dinner as a thank you. In "Ms. Hellfire", the new boss of Bucklands, Mr. Cauldwell, partners Prue with Jack and orders each partnership to raise $100,000 worth of merchandise. When Prue does not come into the office to help Jack, he goes to the manor and demands to know where she has been. Prue tells him that she raised $275,000 from an anonymous estate and they go celebrate. In "Heartbreak City", Jack and Prue go on a date with Piper and [Dan Gordon to see the movie Love Story. They later go on another date at P3, where the demon of hate, Drazi (Clayton Rohner), uses Cupid's (Michael Reilly Burke) ring to make Jack believe that Prue is using him. This causes them to have a fight. Prue and Jack later reconcile and go on another date with Piper and Dan to see The Dirty Dozen.

In "Reckless Abandon", Jack and Prue's presentation at work won them a trip to New York for a conference. However, Prue backs out when a magical emergency intervenes and Jack decides to not go as well. In "Awakened", Prue breaks up with Jack after she resigns from Bucklands.

=== The Source ===
The Source of All Evil, originally played by Michael Bailey Smith, made his first appearance in the season three episode "All Hell Breaks Loose". Bennet Guillory took over the role in the season four episodes "Charmed Again (Part 1)", Charmed Again (Part 2)" and "Brain Drain". Peter Woodward replaced Guillory in the season four episode "Charmed and Dangerous" and the season eight episode "Desperate Housewitches". The Source was the ruler of The Underworld for centuries, until he was vanquished by The Charmed Ones in 2002. He briefly returned in 2005 after a Possessor Demon (Elizabeth Greer) used Wyatt in helping her resurrect The Source. However, as The Source was bound to the Possessor Demon through the magic used to resurrect him, he was once again vanquished when Piper blew up the Possessor Demon.

=== Bob Cowan ===
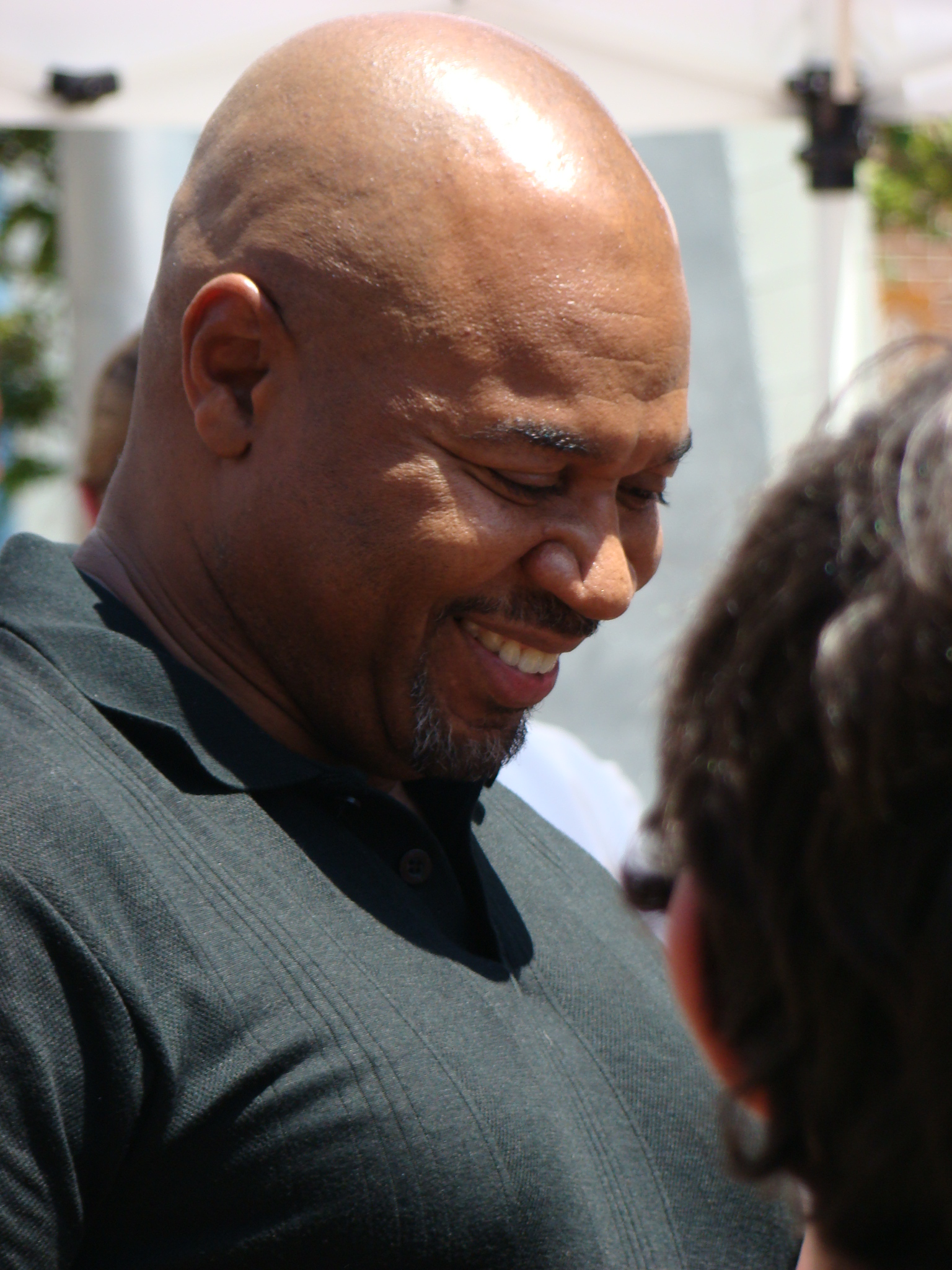
David Reivers (pictured) portrayed Bob Cowan in seasons four and five.

Bob Cowan, played by David Reivers, made his first appearance during the first episode of season four, "Charmed Again (Part 1)". He is Paige's boss at South Bay Social Services. In "Charmed Again (Part 1)", Bob asks Paige for information but she does not pay attention to him because she was reading a newspaper article about Prue's death. Paige then heads out to attend Prue's funeral while Bob calls out her name several times and asks her where she is going. In the episode "Charmed Again (Part 2)", Bob assigns Paige to a case involving Jake (Benjamin Parrillo) and Carol Grisanti (Kim Little), who were both under investigation by Social Services for physically abusing their son. In the third episode of season four, "Hell Hath No Fury", Bob approaches Paige, who is talking to Piper, at her desk and notices she is not working. Bob then asks Piper who she is and Piper replies that she is Paige's sister.

In the season four episode "A Knight to Remember", Bob demands to know what is going on when Paige locks herself in the photocopier room with The Prince (Charlie Weber) from her fairytale. She passes The Prince off as a performer in the Renaissance Fair and the two leave. At the end of the day, The Evil Enchantress (Paige's past life) from her fairytale arrives at South Bay Social Services looking for The Prince and Bob sees her. He assumes Paige is in the Renaissance Fair as well and tells her to lock up before she leaves. In the season four episode "Lost and Bound", a young boy named Tyler Michaels (Alex Black) arrives at South Bay Social Services and Bob tells Paige that the police brought him in because they found him sleeping in an alley. When Bob asks Tyler for his phone number so he can ring his parents to let them know he's okay, Tyler becomes angry and sets fire to a wastebasket by using his powers.

In the season four episode "The Three Faces of Phoebe", Bob offers Paige a promotion to become a full-fledged social worker for having helped a client named Carolyn Seldon (Camilla Rantsen) with getting her son back from her abusive ex-husband. In the process, Bob passed over Scott (Christian Keiber), a more experienced assistant, with the offer. Paige turns down the offer because she used magic to help Carolyn. During the first episode of season five, "A Witch's Tail (Part 1)", Bob tells Paige that she has been promoted to social worker and that it means she has to arrive at work on time. In "A Witch's Tail (Part 2)", Paige quits her job at South Bay Social Services and Bob tells her that she has got a real gift at helping people.

=== The Seer ===
The Seer, played by Debbi Morgan, The Seer was an upper level demon. Duplicitous, manipulative and self-serving, she served several Sources. Her cunning gameplay pits the sisters against one another. Imbued with the power to see the future, she can only be eliminated by the Power of Three.

=== Elise Rothman ===
Elise Rothman, played by Rebecca Balding, is the editor and boss of The Bay Mirror, where Phoebe works as an advice columnist. When Elise first appears in Charmed, her advice columnist is Karen Young (Molly Hagan). At the time, Karen was infected by a demonic power, which made her hate Elise and want to kill her. Phoebe then took over for Karen and did her column. Afterwards, Karen tells Elise the truth about the column; Elise fires her and hires Phoebe in her place. The two start off with a professional, work relationship, often having verbal disputes about deadlines and what not. As the series progresses, they develop a unique bond as friends. When The Charmed Ones fake their deaths in the beginning of season eight, Elise openly admits that Phoebe is her best friend and considers her as the daughter she never had.

Prior to playing Elise, Balding made her first appearance during the first season, seventh episode "The Fourth Sister", as the aunt of a teenage witch.

=== Sheila Morris ===
Sheila Morris, played by Sandra Prosper, made her first appearance during the season five episode "Centennial Charmed". She is married to Darryl. In "Centennial Charmed", the sisters meet Sheila for the first time at Piper's club P3, where together they celebrate Darryl's promotion to lieutenant. In the season five episode "Oh My Goddess (Part 1)", it is revealed that Darryl told Sheila about the sisters being witches and she is able to cope with and understand it. Sheila eventually becomes frustrated when the sisters keep putting Darryl's life and career in danger by covering for them, and she demands that he stops helping them. At the end of season seven, Sheila and Darryl move to the East Coast with their children.

=== Sophie ===
Sophie, played by Amanda Sickler, made her first appearance during the season five episode "Sand Francisco Dreamin'". She is Phoebe's friend and assistant at The Bay Mirror and appears until the final season. When The Charmed Ones fake their deaths in the beginning of season eight, Sophie reveals the sincerity of her friendship with Phoebe while eulogizing her.

=== The Crone ===
The Crone (portrayed by Grace Zabriskie). She is the ancient, demonic foreseer who is the second demon in the series to go after Piper and Leo's child, Wyatt. Unlike most demons in the series, The Crone never had any personal intentions towards the Charmed Ones. Her only intentions were to kidnap baby Wyatt, not to harm him, but to lay hands on him to gain a foresight in his future. She first appears in the episode Baby's First Demon where she is shown to be in control over a demonic market run by demons and warlocks. She sends numerous demons to go after Wyatt, but fails at these attempts. The Crone blames the unsuccessful attempts to kidnap the baby on one of the demons at the market and she vanquishes him after causing Phoebe and Piper to go after his alerts and cause destruction in the demonic market. The Crone makes her second appearance in the episode Sense and Sense Ability where she weakens the Charmed Ones' senses with the aid of a totem monkey of See No Evil, Hear No Evil, and Speak No Evil. She tricks Wyatt into believing she is one of the family, therefore, succeeds into gaining a premonition, only to be caught seconds later by Piper, Phoebe and Paige. The Crone, amazed by Wyatt's incredible and destructive abilities, is vanquished by the Charmed Ones, who gain their senses back.

=== Wyatt Halliwell ===
Wyatt Matthew Halliwell is the first child of Piper and Leo, who made his first appearance during the season five episode "The Day the Magic Died". At first, Wyatt is played by an unknown and uncredited baby. Starting in the season five episode "Necromancing the Stone", infant Wyatt is played by twins Jason and Kristopher Simmons until the series finale "Forever Charmed". In two episodes, young, pre-teen Wyatt is played by two other actors: Ryan Bradford Hanson in the season seven episode "Witchness Protection", and Tanner Fox in "Forever Charmed". As an adult, in flashforward and in time travel stories, Wyatt is played by Wes Ramsey.

Wyatt is the prophesied twice-blessed child, a being of unimaginable power. He is the first born of a Charmed One and the first male witch in his family. Wyatt has the known powers of force fields, orbing, telekinesis, telekinetic-orbing, projection and healing. While he was still in utero, Wyatt was powerful enough to use his powers, namely his force field, which made Piper virtually invincible during her pregnancy. He also once switched his parents' powers temporarily, before switching them back.

In season five, demons such as the Hawker Demon (Jack McGee), Parasites (Andy Mackenzie and Nicholas Sadler) The Crone, attempt to kidnap Wyatt. The Crone succeeds in getting Wyatt and sees a glimpse of his future, warning of a great power yet to come. She is eventually vanquished by The Charmed Ones. Grams is summoned from the afterlife for his wiccaning; she is astonished to discover that he is a boy as males have never been born into the Warren/Halliwell family. However, Penny eventually overcomes her bitterness towards men, accepts Wyatt into the family and performs his wiccaning. In season six, Wyatt is temporarily erased from existence by The Cleaners (Kirk B. R. Woller and Darin Cooper), when he exposes magic to the world by conjuring a massive dragon out of the television and letting it loose in San Francisco. However, The Cleaners stop their quest to take Wyatt after the sisters threaten to keep exposing magic. It is later revealed that Wyatt is the heir of King Arthur and is destined to wield the sword Excalibur. Piper and Leo's second son from the future, Chris, travels to the present day to prevent Wyatt from turning evil. They eventually discovered that the elder Gideon sought to eliminate Wyatt, believing that he was too powerful to keep alive. However, it was Gideon's actions that ultimately caused Wyatt to become evil. Leo later averts this future by killing Gideon.

In season seven, Wyatt uses his healing powers to save Piper from a deadly coma. Piper is called to Wyatt's pre-school when he begins talking to himself; in reality, Wyatt is talking to the demon Vicus (Marcus Chait), who is trying to gain Wyatt's trust to turn him evil. Piper summons adult Wyatt from the future to get answers, and he turns evil before their eyes. Leo is able to regain Wyatt's trust and the spell is reversed. When the sisters prepare to fight the demon Zankou, they leave Wyatt and Chris in the care of their grandfather, in case they do not survive. In season eight, after the sisters and Leo use magical disguises to hideout due to their fake deaths, Piper and Leo regain custody of Wyatt and Chris. During the events of The Charmed Ones' final destined battle, Wyatt is kidnapped by the demon Dumain (Anthony Cistaro), who had Billie and Christy Jenkins steal infant Wyatt's powers to unleash The Hollow, causing his powers to be stripped in the future. Adult Wyatt and Chris then return from the future to figure out what happened. After his powers are restored, adult Wyatt and Chris return to the future. In the flash forward montages to the future, Wyatt and Chris are seen preparing a potion together.

=== Jason Dean ===
Jason Dean, played by Eric Dane, made his first appearance during the season five episode "Baby's First Demon". Jason is introduced into season five as a multi-millionaire and the new owner of The Bay Mirror, where Phoebe works. Phoebe is instantly attracted to him when they first see each other. Jason gets her to write an article about finding love over the Internet and she meets a user online named "Cyrano73". Phoebe later meets "Cyrano73" in person and it turns out to be Jason. Jason eventually starts dating Phoebe and they continue dating in season six, where their relationship becomes more serious. Jason moves to Hong Kong for business and Phoebe goes with him. After 15 months of dating, Jason discovers Phoebe's secret identity as a witch by accident and unable to handle the revelation, breaks up with her.

=== Gideon ===
Gideon (portrayed by Gildart Jackson) initially asks the Halliwells for help when some of his teachers and students are decapitated by a headless horseman. He immediately gains their trust as the headmaster of the school, taken together with Piper's daycare concerns for a very magical toddler. His motives are not truly evil, as he believes he is acting for the Greater Good. In his opinion, Wyatt is too powerful to be kept alive. The arrival of Whitelighter Chris, who comes from a future where Wyatt is a powerful evil tyrant, seems to confirm Gideon's fears.

Gideon's plans to destroy the boy, using demons and warlocks as surrogates, are complicated by the very thing that seemed to prove his suspicions – Chris – who is bent on protecting his older sibling from the influences that turned him evil. The young half-witch/whitelighter vows to find the culprit who turns his brother evil in the future and stop him. Gideon's multi-episode plots are also foiled, nearly as often, by Wyatt's innately strong, if immature magical talents, and Gideon grows increasingly desperate to succeed, gradually exposing himself to discovery. In the end, he risks direct involvement and becomes unmasked to Wyatt's protective parents and family.

Barbas, The Demon Of Fear who was previously vanquished by the Charmed Ones, is reconjured by The Tribunal; he later partners with Gideon in the finale. Once the parents become alerted to and begin looking for the influence threatening the future, Gideon manages (by improvising) to make the Halliwells believe Wyatt is going to be made evil by the hosts of a demonic reality TV show, which involves killing witches. After those threats are vanquished, Gideon kills his henchman, Sigmund, who has assisted him in deceiving everyone but is about to tell everything to the Charmed Ones. Gideon sends Leo and Chris, followed by Paige and Phoebe, into a mirror dimension where Evil rules, to get them out of his way. In the evil world, the good Barbas advises that Gideon has been behind this all along. As Gideon's evil counterpart is caught trying to kill Wyatt, the Phoebes and Paiges of both worlds try to vanquish him, and the balance between Good and Evil shifts. The Good world becomes too good, which affects Piper and then, via a spell she writes while under Barbas' influence, Phoebe and Paige. Leo manages to turn them back to normal and, after Chris dies by Gideon's hands, Leo avenges his death, killing Gideon and restoring the balance in the process.

=== Inspector Sheridan ===
Inspector Sheridan, played by Jenya Lano, made her first appearance during the season six episode "Crimes and Witch Demeanors". She is an Inspector for the San Francisco Police Department. In season six, Sheridan becomes possessed by a Phantasm, as part of the demon Barbas' scheme to escape from purgatory. Sheridan then films Phoebe and Paige using magic, which leads to The Cleaners altering history and framing Darryl for murder. Leo and Chris later find out Sheridan is possessed and bring her before The Tribunal, after which her memories are erased. She later starts investigating Chris' disappearance after he escapes from jail, but stops after seeing him die in the Halliwell manor. In season seven, Sheridan becomes suspicious about Chris' disappearance again and she asks Phoebe to come to the police station to answer a few questions about him. When Phoebe does not turn up, Sheridan goes to the manor to arrest her, but Leo blasts Sheridan into a wall. When Sheridan wakes up, she does not remember being blasted.

Sheridan continues investigating the sisters, including staking out the manor with a reluctant Darryl. She eventually starts working with Federal Agent Kyle Brody (Kerr Smith ), who shares her suspicions. However, when they catch the sisters using magic, Kyle shoots Sheridan with a tranquilizer dart and promises to keep the sister's secret in exchange for their help. It is later revealed that Kyle had Sheridan placed in a mental institution, where she was kept in a comatose state in a secret room. Sheridan loses her memories and the sisters are even more careful around her as they do not want to trigger her lost memories. Sheridan eventually begins pursuing leads against the sisters again, after her suspicions rekindle and she recovers some of her memory. When Homeland Security arrive in San Francisco to investigate the sisters, Sheridan helps them with the investigation and breaks into the manor with a hidden camera. When she enters the attic, Sheridan is confronted by the demon Zankou (Oded Fehr), who kills her with an energy ball.

=== Kyle Brody ===
Kyle Brody, played by Kerr Smith, made his first appearance during the season seven episode "Charrrmed!". He works as a federal agent for Homeland Security. Kyle first appears in San Francisco to help Darryl Morris and Inspector Sheridan with a case involving the sisters. He reveals that he knows the sisters are witches. When they catch the sisters using magic, Kyle shoots Inspector Sheridan with a tranquilizer dart and allows the sisters to escape. He helps cover for Piper, who was recruited by the Angel of Death, by telling the press that he faked her death for a top secret mission. Kyle finds out about Paige's powers not long after, due to her accidentally orbing into his apartment. He tells Paige that he does not want to expose them or hurt them, and that he just needs their help to find out who killed his parents.

Kyle investigates several accidents where people manage to survive their homes burning to the ground, only to be killed shortly after. His research led him to find out that a celerity demon named Sarpedon (Neil Hopkins) was capturing guardian angels and using them to guide and guard him in his hope of becoming indestructible to The Avatars. Kyle and Paige planned to have his guardian angel be a target of Sarpedon but instead, Sarpedon goes for Paige's. Afterwards, Kyle is captured by Sarpedon and held in his lair, only to be saved by Paige later on. After a Gnome (Michael Lee Gogin) was murdered at Magic School, Paige enlists Kyle's help to find out who killed him. When Kyle opens a novel called Crossed, Double-Crossed, he found near the Gnome's body, he and Paige are sucked into the book's film noir black-and-white setting. They are later transported out of the book and start dating.

Kyle believes that The Avatars were responsible for his parents death. After he nearly kills Leo for being an Avatar, Phoebe suggests that Kyle go back in time with Paige to find out what really happened to his parents the night they died. Kyle and Paige meet his mother Ruth Brody (Jessica Steen) and father Jack Brody (Jon Hamm), as well as Kyle's past self. When Ruth and Jack arrive at a warehouse near JFK to inspect some ancient artifacts (that are actually vanquishing potions for Avatars), Kyle sees it was celerity demons that killed his parents. Although it was proven that The Avatars did not kill his parents, Kyle remains unconvinced of their motives and consequently forms an alliance with the demon Zankou (Oded Fehr), because they both want to keep things as they are and to not create Utopia. Although Kyle is reluctant to the idea, Zankou kills the celerity demons who murdered his parents. Kyle is killed while taking out the Avatar Beta (Patrice Fisher). After his death, The Elders turn him into a whitelighter because they thought he had done enough good in his life.

=== Zankou ===
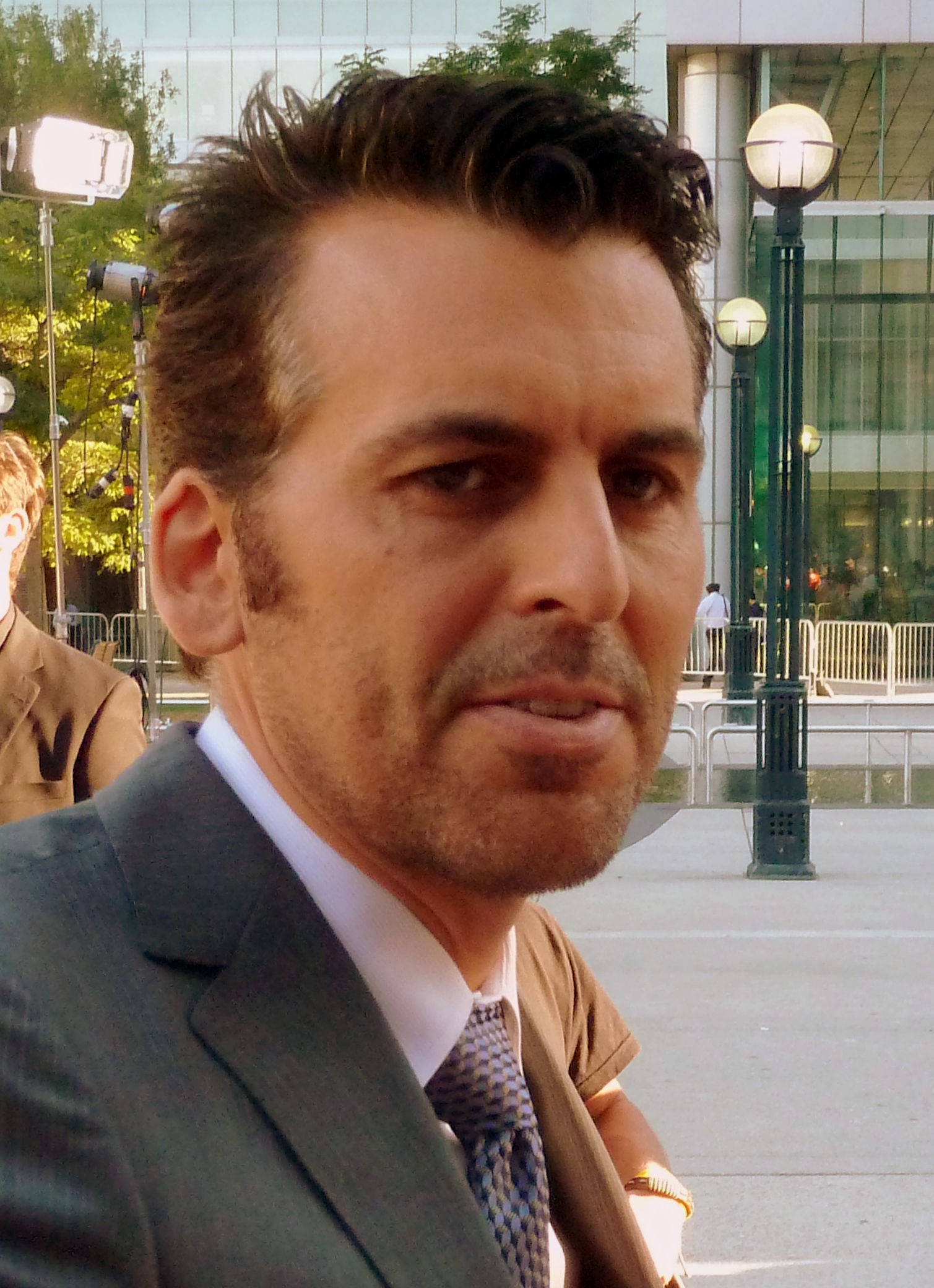
Oded Fehr (pictured) portrayed the demon Zankou during the seventh season.

Zankou, played by Oded Fehr, made his first appearance during the season seven episode "Witchness Protection". He is a powerful upper-level demon who got released from his prison by a group of demons who believe he is the only one who could prevent the impending attack of the Avatars. Zankou helps The Charmed Ones in their fight with The Avatars along with Leo and Kyle, after realizing that The Avatars' Utopia threatens the survival of demonic existence, as well as the free will of all others. When the threat of The Avatars passes, Zankou begins to mobilize The Underworld in hopes of controlling it. After several attempts, he manages to steal the Book of Shadows and tries to control the Nexus. Zankou is vanquished when he absorbs the Nexus into his body and The Charmed Ones cast a banishing spell to destroy it.

=== Dex Lawson ===
Dex Lawson, portrayed by Jason Lewis, was an artist who apparently has an interest in Phoebe in the beginning of season eight, after finding out that she was dead. Phoebe surprisingly has a premonition that they are going to get married. After an overnight trip with him, they get married, but only under the influence of a spell. She has no other choice but to tell him the truth: that she is a witch. She predicted that he was going to be her child's father and later on takes a pregnancy test believing she is pregnant. Her second test proved it was false. With that, she told Dex to annul the marriage and to take things slower. However, they never resume their relationship.

=== Henry Mitchell ===
Henry Mitchell, portrayed by Ivan Sergei, Paige's husband and a parole officer. He knows she's a witch and at first was confused as to why Paige didn't use her witchly powers to end world hunger and other world problems. He later grew to understand how the battle between good and evil works and had no problem with Paige being a witch but often refused to hide when there was a demon attack. He and Paige first met in "Battle of the Hexes", where Henry was parole officer to Paige's new charge. While at first they didn't really like each other, their relationship grew over time. They had a son named Henry Jr. and twin girls.

=== Christy Jenkins ===
Christy Jenkins, portrayed by Marnette Patterson, was the tragic older sister of The Charmed Ones' protégé Billie who was kidnapped by evil demons when she was seven and Billie was five.Christy was a witch with the power of pyrokinesis and telepathy. Christy's abduction was engineered by the Scabber demons as part of a demonic prophecy of a means to destroy The Charmed Ones. The sisters become the tutors and protectors of the younger sister, while she works to find and free her sibling from the forces of evil twisting and shaping the older Christy. As season eight's ratings fell off for the network as a whole, the decision to end the series came to be embedded in the writing with Christy as the vehicle triggering a final battle which would allow Piper to regain Leo.

=== Coop ===
Coop, played by Victor Webster, made his first appearance during the season eight episode "Engaged and Confused". He is a cupid: a magical being associated with love. Coop was sent by The Elders to help Phoebe repair her love life, after she had given it up so many times for the greater good. Over time, the two begin to develop feelings for each other. Coop falls for Phoebe first, but continues setting her up with other men to make her happy. However, Phoebe rejects all of Coop's matches as she was falling in love with him too. Knowing that it was forbidden for cupids to date or marry their charges, Phoebe and Coop hide their feelings from each other to save themselves from the trauma that Piper and Leo went through. However, during the series finale, adult Wyatt and Chris from the future reveal that The Elders made an exception for Phoebe and Coop due to everything they put her through over the years. Also during the finale, an epilogue depicts Phoebe and Coop's wedding and the three daughters they eventually have.
