= Charmed season 5 =

Season of television series

Charmed
- Season 5
- DVD cover
- Starring: Alyssa Milano; Rose McGowan; Holly Marie Combs; Brian Krause; Julian McMahon; Dorian Gregory
- No. of episodes: 23

Release
- Original network: The WB
- Original release: September 22, 2002 – May 11, 2003

Season chronology
- ← Previous; Season 4 Next → Season 6

The fifth season of Charmed, an American supernatural drama television series created by Constance M. Burge, originally aired in the United States on The WB from September 22, 2002 through May 11, 2003. Airing on Sundays at 8:00 pm. Paramount Home Entertainment released the complete fifth season in a six-disc box set on June 6, 2006. It was later released on high-definition blu-ray on July 20, 2021.

== Cast and characters ==
=== Main ===
- Alyssa Milano as Phoebe Halliwell
- Rose McGowan as Paige Matthews
- Holly Marie Combs as Piper Halliwell
- Brian Krause as Leo Wyatt
- Julian McMahon as Cole Turner (Note: McMahon is only credited for the episodes he appears in.)
- Dorian Gregory as Darryl Morris (Note: Gregory is only credited for the episodes he appears in.)

=== Recurring ===
- Jennifer Rhodes as Penny Halliwell
- James Read as Victor Bennett
- Finola Hughes as Patty Halliwell
- Rebecca Balding as Elise Rothman
- Sandra Prosper as Sheila Morris
- Eric Dane as Jason Dean

=== Guest ===
- Jaime Pressly as Mylie
- Nancy O'Dell as herself
- Sean Patrick Flanery as Adam Prinze
- Melinda Clarke as The Siren
- Mark. A. Sheppard as Arnon
- Tobin Bell as Orin
- Emmanuelle Vaugier as Dr. Ava Nicolae
- Billy Drago as Barbas, the Demon of Fear
- Ken Marino as Miles
- Jason Brooks as Bacarra
- Scott Jaeck as Sam Wilder
- Tony Todd as The Avatar of Force
- Joel Swetow as Alpha
- Adrian Paul as Jeric
- Erik King as Dex
- Henry Gibson as Sandman
- Austin Peck as Ryder
- Richard Lynch as Cronyn
- W. Morgan Sheppard as Merrill
- J.P. Manoux as Stanley
- Cheryl Ladd as Doris Bennett
- Grace Zabriskie as The Crone
- Dominic Fumusa as Saleel
- Zachary Quinto (uncredited) as Familiar Hunter
- Norman Reedus as Nate Park
- Chris Sarandon as The Necromancer
- Lee Arenberg as Unidentified Demon
- Cork Hubbert as Finnegan
- Drew Fuller as Chris Perry Halliwell

=== Special Appearance by ===
- Pat Benatar & Neil Giraldo as Themselves

=== Special Musical Guest ===
- The Flaming Lips
- Michelle Branch
- Beth Orton
- Loudermilk

== Episodes ==
No. overall	No. in season	Title	Directed by	Written by	Original release date	Prod. code	U.S. viewers (millions)
89	1	"A Witch's Tail"	James L. Conway	Daniel Cerone	September 22, 2002	62015-05-089	6.32
90	2	"A Witch's Tail"	Mel Damski	Monica Breen & Alison Schapker	September 22, 2002	62015-05-090	6.32
Piper, Phoebe, and Paige come to the aid of Mylie (Jaime Pressly), a Mermaid-turned-human, when she shows up looking for their help after a pact she made with an evil Sea Hag. Meanwhile, Phoebe attempts to divorce Cole, until he shows up claiming to want her back. Paige attempts to juggle her new position as a full fledged Social Worker, as well as being a Charmed One, and Piper must protect her unborn baby. Piper, Paige, and Leo struggle to convince Phoebe, now a mermaid, to come back to her life as a Charmed One, when she decides to swim away from her problems with Cole. Meanwhile, Piper casts a spell to stop her panic attacks but instead of facing her fear, she suppresses it, endangering herself and her baby, when a sea demon comes after Phoebe. In order to help Phoebe, Paige takes drastic measures and enlists the help of Cole. Later, Phoebe tells Cole that it is over between them and signs the divorce papers.
91	3	"Happily Ever After"	John T. Kretchmer	Curtis Kheel	September 29, 2002	62015-05-091	5.06
An evil witch traps the sisters in distorted versions of classic fairy tales, where Phoebe attends a ball as Cinderella and meets Prince Charming, Paige has a taste of Snow White's poisoned apple, and Piper encounters a big, bad wolf, as Little Red Riding Hood.
92	4	"Siren Song"	Joel J. Feigenbaum	Krista Vernoff	October 6, 2002	62015-05-092	5.27
Cole and Phoebe both fall under the musical hypnotic spell of the Siren, who musically lures and attracts husbands to her and enchantingly entrances their wives to follow with the intent to kill, leaving Piper and Paige to figure out how to save Phoebe. Piper, upset with Leo because he does not understand the challenges of being pregnant, and Leo, frustrated that Piper does not realize the demands of being a Whitelighter, have their powers switched magically by their unborn child.
93	5	"Witches in Tights"	David Straiton	Mark Wilding	October 13, 2002	62015-05-093	4.95
A young boy, Kevin (Andrew James Allen), whose drawings magically come to life is forced to create a drawing that transforms a demon into a super-villain. To help the Charmed Ones stop the demon, the boy creates a new drawing that turns Piper, Phoebe, and Paige into comic book super heroines. Finally, the villain turns himself into a powerful super-villain and destroys the Charmed Ones super powers by ripping up the drawing. With the help of Kevin, the Charmed Ones in turn manage to destroy his super powers and Piper blows him up.
94	6	"The Eyes Have It"	James Marshall	Laurie Parres	October 20, 2002	62015-05-094	5.21
With her power of premonition gone, Phoebe seeks the advice of a fortune teller and discovers in a premonition that a demon named Cree is going to kill every member in a family of Gypsies. Meanwhile, Piper wants to see a doctor about her baby but Leo is concerned about the threat of exposure.
95	7	"Sympathy for the Demon"	Stuart Gillard	Henry Alonso Myers	November 3, 2002	62015-05-095	4.77
Barbas, the Demon of Fear, returns and tricks Paige into giving him Cole's powers, and plots revenge on the sisters by playing them against their darkest fears.
96	8	"A Witch in Time"	John Behring	Daniel Cerone	November 10, 2002	62015-05-096	5.46
Phoebe inadvertently opens a tunnel in time by repeatedly saving the life of her new boyfriend Miles, who is destined to die. The time tunnel provides a pathway for a warlock from the future named Baccara to team up with his present self and steal the Book of Shadows. With the help of his present self he steals the Charmed Ones powers and kills Phoebe and Paige. Piper manages to escape with Leo's help and uses the time rift to travel back in time. There she gets her past self to prevent Phoebe from saving Miles, changing time and setting history onto its right track.
97	9	"Sam, I Am"	Joel J. Feigenbaum	Alison Schapker & Monica Breen	November 17, 2002	62015-05-097	5.08
When Cole realizes that he must eventually give in to evil, he attacks the Charmed Ones in the hope that they will vanquish him forever and end his suffering. Paige gets her first charge as a Whitelighter and is shocked when the angry, self-pitying man she is supposed to protect turns out to be the father she never knew. Ultimately the sisters come up with a vanquish for Cole, but Phoebe realizes he is trying to commit suicide and does not want to complete it. Cole, now insane, uses the last potion on himself in an attempt at suicide, but despite a massive explosion that destroys his apartment, he is unscathed.
98	10	"Y Tu Mummy También"	Chris Long	Curtis Kheel	January 5, 2003	62015-05-098	5.46
Phoebe falls prey to Jeric, a demon in search of the perfect body to hold the spirit of Isis, his dead lover. To trap the spirit, Jeric mummifies Phoebe's body. Cole tries to save Phoebe by making a deal with the Jeric by exchanging Phoebe's body for Paige's. Piper tricks the demon and saves Paige who is able to free Phoebe and banish the spirit. Piper destroys the demon by blowing him up with her molecular combustion power, and Cole leaves promising to win next time.
99	11	"The Importance of Being Phoebe"	Derek Johansen	Krista Vernoff	January 12, 2003	62015-05-099	5.40
After kidnapping Phoebe, Cole sends a shapeshifter named Kaia to assume Phoebe's identity to help him manipulate Piper and Paige into giving him ownership of the manor, allowing him access to the powerful Nexus located beneath the house. Meanwhile, Phoebe plans her escape, while Cole gets Paige arrested and ensures that Piper's club fails to pass health inspections in order to keep them distracted.
100	12	"Centennial Charmed"	James L. Conway	Brad Kern	January 19, 2003	62015-05-100	5.49
In his twisted attempt to win Phoebe back, Cole casts a spell that alters reality, which eliminates Paige as a Halliwell and destroys the Power of Three. Paige suddenly finds that her sisters have no knowledge of her existence and that past villains are still alive, meaning all the innocents they saved are dead. Paige recreates the Power of Three and regains her powers. Using them, she retrieves the vanquishing potion she made to kill the vulnerable Cole and prepares to finally kill him, but is stopped by Phoebe. Cole does not try to escape, thinking Phoebe loves him too much to kill him, but Phoebe throws the potion herself, finally killing Cole. Cole's death reverts the world to normal and only Paige remembers what happened.
101	13	"House Call"	Jon Paré	Henry Alonso Myers	February 2, 2003	62015-05-101	5.33
When residue left from demonic vanquishes builds up in the manor, the sisters lose sleep and it takes over their lives. They call upon the Witch Doctor, whom Leo does not trust. The Witch Doctor makes a house call to the Charmed Ones but because of the massive amount of demonic energy he believes they are evil. It turns out that Leo was right not to trust him, as he tries to kill the sisters by using voodoo dolls to make them obsess and lead them down various paths of destruction. Piper becomes obsessed with cleaning, Paige with marrying her ex-boyfriend Glen, and Phoebe with eliminating her work rivals.
102	14	"Sand Francisco Dreamin'"	John T. Kretchmer	Alison Schapker & Monica Breen	February 9, 2003	62015-05-102	5.14
A demon attacks the Charmed Ones with dream dust he stole from a Sandman, causing their nightmares to come to life. Phoebe dreams about someone trying to kill her, Piper dreams she has a secret and sexy lover, Paige dreams about her childhood clown doll and loneliness, and Leo dreams about something happening to the baby. The sisters must defeat their worries in their dreams, before they are destroyed. Ultimately, Phoebe learns that her mysterious attacker is herself, Paige is afraid of being alone due to her secret birth, and Piper's lover is actually Leo. Leo ends up feeling closer to the baby when he feels it kick. The demon shows up expecting to have their nightmares backing him up and is shocked to see that they are not and Piper blows him up.
103	15	"The Day the Magic Died"	Stuart Gillard	Daniel Cerone	February 16, 2003	62015-05-103	5.60
Piper is due in six weeks and has to be on bed rest because of her high blood pressure. Phoebe, Paige, and Leo realize that all magic has stopped and that it has been foretold in the prophecy of the twice-blessed child, whom up until the time of its birth, magic will lay dormant. A sorcerer knows of this, and he plans to kill the sisters so he can raise Piper's baby as a powerful force of evil. Phoebe and Paige discover that Victor's new wife, Doris (Cheryl Ladd), is a demon who plans to aide the sorcerer in the kidnapping of Piper's baby. When Piper attempts to escape, she goes into labor. Phoebe and Paige arrive just in time and vanquish Doris and the sorcerer, Cronyn. Leo soon shows up and Piper gives birth to their baby, to the surprise of everyone, turns out to be a boy in a swirl of orbs.
104	16	"Baby's First Demon"	John T. Kretchmer	Krista Vernoff	March 30, 2003	62015-05-104	5.61
Everyone is having a hard time finding a name for the baby, especially a boy's name that starts with a P. Leo tries out Peter, while Phoebe tries out Potter (in a reference to Harry Potter). Leo says his son's last name is going to be Halliwell instead of Wyatt because good magic respects it while evil fears it. Eventually, Piper decides to name her baby Wyatt Matthew Halliwell. The sisters must protect Wyatt from two demons, but the baby has a few surprises of his own. Paige goes undercover as a bounty hunter and Phoebe's future with the newspaper is threatened by the new owner.
105	17	"Lucky Charmed"	Roxann Dawson	Curtis Kheel	April 6, 2003	62015-05-105	4.51
The Charmed Ones face a demon who has been killing leprechauns and stealing their magic. The leprechauns endow the sisters with good luck, which enables Paige to gain material wealth, Phoebe to meet a man, and Piper to book a major star to play at P3.
106	18	"Cat House"	James L. Conway	Brad Kern	April 13, 2003	62015-05-106	4.17
When Piper and Leo begin to have marital problems, Piper casts a spell to allow them to literally see their past together. The spell goes awry when Phoebe and Paige are sent back in time to relive Piper's memories, and a warlock (Zachary Quinto) bent on destroying the Charmed Ones' familiar tags along for the ride. Prue is briefly seen when Phoebe and Paige visit Piper's wedding during her memories. She is also seen during the time she was a dog with Phoebe saying to Paige 'Well you always said you wanted to meet Prue'.
107	19	"Nymphs Just Want to Have Fun"	Mel Damski	Andrea Stevens & Doug E. Jones	April 20, 2003	62015-05-107	4.25
When a demon attacks and kills the Satyr of the Spring of Life, one of the three nymphs that protect a lake seeks the Charmed Ones help. Once the demon is destroyed, the nymphs decide Paige should replace the fallen nymph and won't take no for an answer.
108	20	"Sense and Sense Ability"	Stewart Schill & Joel J. Feigenbaum	Story by : Brian Krause & Ed Bokinskie; Teleplay by : Daniel Cerone & Krista Vernoff	April 27, 2003	62015-05-108	4.08
While at the fair, the Crone turns a monkey totem of Hear No Evil, See No Evil, Speak No Evil into a real monkey. This monkey takes Paige's voice, Phoebe's hearing, and Piper's eyesight; leaving the girls vulnerable to attack so the Crone can capture Wyatt. While Piper bonds with baby Wyatt, Phoebe falls for her new boss, Jason.
109	21	"Necromancing the Stone"	Jon Paré	Henry Alonso Myers & Alison Schapker & Monica Breen	May 4, 2003	62015-05-109	4.99
When Grams is summoned for a Wiccan birthing ceremony, for Wyatt, the sisters find out that she has brought a former lover from her past, the Necromancer demon (Chris Sarandon), who wants to kill the Charmed Ones and bring back the love they once shared. Meanwhile, Phoebe contemplates Jason's invitation to go with him to Hong Kong, even though it will take her away from her family and Paige casts a truth spell to figure out if Nate can accept her being a witch, getting more than she bargained for.
110	22	"Oh My Goddess"	Jonathan West	Krista Vernoff & Curtis Kheel	May 11, 2003	62015-05-110	4.90
111	23	"Oh My Goddess"	Joel J. Feigenbaum	Daniel Cerone	May 11, 2003	62015-05-111	4.90
When there is a freak heat wave, Paige is worried that there may be something demonic behind the weird weather and sets out to figure out why. Phoebe tries to deal with life with Jason in Hong Kong and helps Elise organize a bachelor auction at P3. Piper and Leo have to use their therapy tools when Leo is called up to the Elders. The Titans are released from a long slumber and begin going after Whitelighters, and all of the magical creatures from San Francisco come to the manor in an effort to get the Charmed Ones to save them. Paige gets turned to stone after she summons one of the Titans, and almost dies before a strange Whitelighter, named Chris Perry, appears and sends the Titan away. Piper finds out that the Titans are going after Whitelighters so they can go after the Elders and tells Leo. While he is up there, Leo begins blaming Chris, but finds out that he has to turn Piper, Phoebe, and Paige into mythological Goddesses themselves in order for them to defeat the Titans. Now all-powerful Goddesses, the Charmed Ones must try not to be seduced by their new powers and stay focused on vanquishing The Titans before they destroy all Whitelighters and Elders. Piper, wields the powers of the Goddess of Earth, Phoebe is the Goddess of Love, and Paige is the Goddess of War. Meanwhile, Leo becomes an Elder as a reward for his actions, turning Piper's life upside-down. Her loss and anger consumes her, allowing the Charmed Ones to destroy The Titans. Chris is made the Charmed Ones' new Whitelighter. Piper's anger at Leo causes her to take her anger out on the world, but her sisters get through to her and Leo takes away her pain so she can move on. After Leo asks Chris to take care of the girls, Chris secretly banishes Leo as he orbs away.
