= Charmed season 6 =

Season of television series

Charmed
- Season 6
- DVD cover
- Starring: Alyssa Milano; Rose McGowan; Holly Marie Combs; Brian Krause; Drew Fuller; Dorian Gregory
- No. of episodes: 23

Release
- Original network: The WB
- Original release: September 28, 2003 – May 16, 2004

Season chronology
- ← Previous; Season 5 Next → Season 7

The sixth season of Charmed, an American supernatural drama television series created by Constance M. Burge, originally aired in the United States on The WB from September 28, 2003, through May 16, 2004. Airing on Sundays at 8:00 pm. Paramount Home Entertainment released the complete sixth season in a six-disc box set on October 17, 2006. It was later released on high-definition blu-ray on July 20, 2021.

== Cast and characters ==
=== Main ===
- Alyssa Milano as Phoebe Halliwell
- Rose McGowan as Paige Matthews
- Holly Marie Combs as Piper Halliwell
- Brian Krause as Leo Wyatt
- Drew Fuller as Chris Halliwell (Note: Fuller is only credited for the episodes he appears in.)
- Dorian Gregory as Darryl Morris (Note: Gregory is only credited for the episodes he appears in.)

=== Recurring ===
- James Read as Victor Bennett
- Jennifer Rhodes as Penny Halliwell
- Rebecca Balding as Elise Rothman
- Sandra Prosper as Sheila Morris
- Eric Dane as Jason Dean
- Balthazar Getty as Richard Montana
- Gildart Jackson as Gideon
- Christopher Neiman as Sigmund
- Betsy Randle as Mrs. Winterbourne
- Billy Drago as Barbas, the Demon of Fear
- Jenya Lano as Inspector Sheridan

=== Guest ===
- Wes Ramsey as Wyatt Halliwell
- Marisol Nichols as Bianca
- Rebecca McFarland as Lynn
- Melissa George as Freyja
- Ivana Miličević as Mist
- Evan Marriott as Oscar
- Jennifer Sky as Mabel Stillman
- Jenny McCarthy as Mitzy Stillman
- Melody Perkins as Margo Stillman
- Rachelle Lefevre as Olivia Callaway
- Michael Muhney as Seth
- Mako as Potion Sorcerer
- Gina Ravera as Mary
- Kathryn Joosten as Old Magician's Wife
- Keith Szarabajka as Zahn
- Jake Busey as Nigel
- Patrick Cassidy as Allen Halliwell
- Eduardo Verástegui as Mr. Right
- Sarah Rafferty as Carol
- Scott Adsit as Transformed Male Nymph
- Ian Abercrombie as Aramis
- Ken Page as Adair
- Christopher Cazenove as Thrask
- James Horan as Crill
- Gabriel Olds as Vincent Right / Vincent Wrong
- Jim Pirri as Corr
- Elaine Hendrix as Clea
- David Ramsey as Upper-Level Demon

=== Special Musical Guest ===
- Smash Mouth
- Steadman
- Ziggy Marley
- Andy Stochansky

== Episodes ==
| No. overall | No. in season | Title | Directed by | Written by | Original release date | Prod. code | U.S. viewers (millions) |
|---|---|---|---|---|---|---|---|
| 112 | 1 | "Valhalley of the Dolls" | James L. Conway | Brad Kern | September 28, 2003 | 62015-06-112 | 6.26 |
| 113 | 2 | "Valhalley of the Dolls" | James L. Conway | Brad Kern | September 28, 2003 | 62015-06-113 | 6.26 |
Even though Leo is gone, Piper is in a surprisingly chipper mood, leading Paige to suspect that Leo altered Piper's memory. However, Paige's spell to restore Piper's memory clashes with Leo's and causes total amnesia. When calling upon Leo for help, Phoebe and Paige discover that he is being held captive on the Island of Valhalla, a mythical place ruled by warrior-maidens known as Valkyries. Phoebe also discovers she is an empath, where she can feel people's emotions, much to the worry of Chris. The Charmed Ones disguise themselves as Valkyries and infiltrate Valhalla to try to rescue Leo. In order for them to get close to him, they must convince the Valkyries that they are one of them. While Phoebe and Paige go to Darryl to borrow his soul, Chris kills a Valkyrie by crushing her heart through his telekinetic power, to possess a Valkyrie's necklace. The sight of Leo causes Piper's pain to come flooding back, prompting her to stay behind on the island to forget the pain while everyone else escapes. Three fallen warriors follow Paige and Phoebe across dimensions to San Francisco and wreak havoc on the city. Phoebe has to control her new power in order to convince Piper that she belongs with her sisters, not the Valkyries. Meanwhile, Paige takes a job as a dog walker and is amazed when one of her dogs is transformed back into a man. Leo later uncovers evidence that Chris had killed two Valkyries, but opts not to use it because Chris had finally earned the Charmed Ones' trust.
| 114 | 3 | "Forget Me... Not" | John T. Kretchmer | Henry Alonso Myers | October 5, 2003 | 62015-06-114 | 5.84 |
When Wyatt inadvertently brings a dragon to life, the Cleaners, a neutral group dedicated to protecting magic from being exposed, take him away and erase all signs and memories of his existence. Aware that they are forgetting something important but not sure of what it is, Piper, Phoebe, and Paige cast a spell to return their memory. The sisters then set out to expose magic, to strike up a deal with the Cleaners.
| 115 | 4 | "The Power of Three Blondes" | John Behring | Daniel Cerone | October 12, 2003 | 62015-06-115 | 5.38 |
When three evil sisters magically steal the Charmed Ones' identities and powers, Piper, Phoebe, and Paige must convince Chris that they are the real Charmed Ones in order to get their lives back. Meanwhile, Piper realizes that Wyatt needs time with Leo, who continues on his quest to find out who put him on the Island of Valhalla.
| 116 | 5 | "Love's a Witch" | Stuart Gillard | Jeannine Renshaw | October 19, 2003 | 62015-06-116 | 5.35 |
When Paige's latest temp job puts her in the middle of an ongoing feud between two magical families, the Montanas and the Callaways, she falls for Richard Montana and urges both families to consider a truce. Paige, Phoebe, and Piper hold a séance with both families and everyone is stunned to learn that Richard's first love, Olivia Callaway, is the one who has been escalating the feud to avenge her death. Paige becomes possessed by Olivia's spirit so Phoebe & Piper must banish Olivia in order to save Paige and the two families. However, Paige's abduction of Richard while possessed and the near death of his mother, cause the families to end the feud as they decide they want no more death. Olivia's dad and Richard's mom lead Phoebe and Piper to Olivia's grave where Paige tries to attack, but is prevented by Piper. Phoebe and Piper go to vanquish her, but are stopped by Paige who felt Olivia's intense pain while possessed by her and Paige and Richard are able to convince her to move on peacefully. Meanwhile, Leo is suspicious when Chris travels to The Underworld in search of a potion and trails him in secret. The potion turns out to be an empath blocking potion, and Piper and Paige are able to use it to block Phoebe's new power on them, however, when they are gone, Chris secretly uses it on himself too.
| 117 | 6 | "My Three Witches" | Joel J. Feigenbaum | Scott Lipsey & Whip Lipsey | October 26, 2003 | 62015-06-117 | 5.49 |
Worried that the Charmed Ones are drifting apart by putting their personal lives before their "Charmed" duties, Chris tries to teach them a lesson by enlisting the help of the demon Gith, who creates an alternate reality for the sisters by tapping into their secret desires. Piper's secret desire is to live a normal life, Phoebe feels her boyfriend's, Jason Dean, desire, for her to be a famous celebrity and have her own television show, and Paige's is to not have to hide her magic. Chris tries to kill Gith, but is prevented from doing so when he is shot with a Darklighter arrow. Wyatt ends up becoming seriously ill and when Piper tries to get him to the hospital, she ends up in a car crash while Paige gets attacked by multiple demons and insane fans try to kill Phoebe. Chris manages to put Phoebe into Paige's world and together they manage to channel themselves into Piper's. Gith, desperate, transports himself to Piper's world, but Phoebe fights him off. Gith is vanquished when Piper's SUV explodes and he is consumed in the explosion. His vanquish frees the sisters and Wyatt and they discover a near-death Chris. Piper quickly calls for Leo who heals Wyatt of his illness and Chris of his wound and they return home where the sisters have learned their lesson.
| 118 | 7 | "Soul Survivor" | Mel Damski | Curtis Kheel | November 2, 2003 | 62015-06-118 | 5.19 |
In an attempt to save her boss' soul, Paige goes behind her sisters backs and makes a deal with a demon (Keith Szarabjka). Meanwhile, Piper learns that Wyatt has been sabotaging her dates. Phoebe gets a new writing partner, and Chris and Leo accidentally travel back in time.
| 119 | 8 | "Sword and the City" | Derek Johansen | David Simkins | November 9, 2003 | 62015-06-119 | 5.18 |
The Lady of the Lake appears before the Charmed Ones, pleading for their help in protecting Excalibur, the legendary Sword in the Stone. A dozen magical beings arrive at the manor to try their hand at pulling the sword from the stone, but it is Piper who pulls Excalibur out, causing a whirlwind that coalesces into a mysterious figure called Mordaunt. Piper is unaware that she is meant to pass it on to Wyatt, heir of Excalibur and the next King Arthur. Richard realizes that Mordaunt cannot be trusted, but before he can intervene, Mordaunt tricks Piper into relinquishing the sword and its power to him.
| 120 | 9 | "Little Monsters" | James L. Conway | Julie Hess | November 16, 2003 | 62015-06-120 | 5.30 |
After vanquishing a Manticore demon, Piper, Phoebe, and Paige become foster parents to its orphaned half-breed infant, whose human father Derek (Seth Peterson) holds Piper hostage until his son is returned. Upon Chris' plea to vanquish the child, the sisters come to believe that, by raising the child with love, they can change its destiny. Meanwhile, Phoebe surprises her boyfriend Jason when she responds to feelings he has not expressed yet, and Paige gives Darryl a superpower.
| 121 | 10 | "Chris-Crossed" | Joel J. Feigenbaum | Cameron Litvack | November 23, 2003 | 62015-06-121 | 6.03 |
A mysterious woman from the future named Bianca arrives to take Chris' powers and bring him back with her forcefully. Piper feels that being witches is stopping her sisters from having the life they want, and advises them to move out and follow their hearts. Bianca is revealed to actually be Chris' fiancée who only came back as "he" would have sent someone else if she had not come. Bianca is revealed to have helped Chris come back in time in the first place and apparently met him after the unnamed evil that rules their future sent her to kill him. Chris also reveals some truth about himself after Piper tries to freeze him and Bianca and fails: he is not a true Whitelighter, he is half-Whitelighter, half-witch like Paige and Wyatt. Bianca strips his powers and brings him back to his terrible future where the evil who rules confronts Chris and Bianca alone; an evil Wyatt. Future Wyatt tries to convince Chris to join him, offering to spare his life if he does. Chris refuses and Wyatt tries to kill him, but he is saved by Bianca who switches back to his side to protect him. Using a spell the sisters left in the attic in the present, Chris reclaims his powers and defeats Wyatt temporarily, but Bianca is mortally wounded and dies. Chris manages to open a time portal and escapes as Wyatt recovers, taking the spell with him so that Wyatt cannot send another assassin back in time. In the present, the sisters forgive him and he remains their Whitelighter, but he swears that if he can't prevent Baby Wyatt from becoming evil, then he will stop him permanently.
| 122 | 11 | "Witchstock" | James A. Contner | Daniel Cerone | January 11, 2004 | 62015-06-122 | 5.29 |
After trying on a pair of her Grams' go-go boots, Paige finds herself transported back in time to an era of free love and free magic. She discovers Grams, a peace-loving hippie, who is on a crusade to rid the world of evil through the magical power of love, preparing for a "magical be-in" at the manor. Meanwhile in present time a magic-sucking slime attacks the manor. Guest starring Jake Busey.
| 123 | 12 | "Prince Charmed" | David Jackson | Henry Alonso Myers | January 18, 2004 | 62015-06-123 | 3.89 |
After vanquishing a demon from Wyatt's room, Piper has an epiphany and decides to swear off men so that she can devote the rest of her life to raising and protecting Wyatt. Unable to handle Piper's revelation, Paige and Phoebe decide to remind Piper of the importance of love by conjuring up a "Mr. Right" as Piper's birthday present. The Order, a demonic brotherhood, manage to kidnap Wyatt after Chris' meddling with "Prince Charmed's" attractiveness backfires, turning a birthday dinner party into a food fight. The sisters vanquish the Order and with Chris' help restore Wyatt to normal. Doing so apparently earns Wyatt's trust for Chris and Leo confirms later that he still trusts Chris, but Chris needs to earn back the sisters' trust.
| 124 | 13 | "Used Karma" | John T. Kretchmer | Jeannine Renshaw | January 25, 2004 | 62015-06-124 | 4.23 |
Piper, Phoebe, and Paige inadvertently expose themselves as witches in front of Jason, causing him to leave Phoebe. Richard casts a spell to free himself of his family's negative karma, but accidentally channels the spirit of Mata Hari, a double agent against Germany for France during WWI, into Phoebe. Phoebe decides to get revenge on Jason by arranging for a demonic firing squad to kill him. Meanwhile, Piper and Paige try to vanquish a group of Swarm Demons, the last on Chris' list of the most significant threats to Wyatt.
| 125 | 14 | "The Legend of Sleepy Halliwell" | Jon Paré | Cameron Litvack | February 8, 2004 | 62015-06-125 | 4.79 |
The three sisters are railing at the complications and deleterious impact magic has on their lives when a portal opens in the middle of their stairway landing. An Elder named Gideon, Leo's old mentor at Magic School, calls upon Piper, Phoebe, and Paige to find out who cast the spell of darkness upon the school and conjured up the Headless Horseman, who has been beheading the teachers. While Piper and Paige tackle a group of surly teenagers, Piper becomes the horseman's next victim and become a functioning head on a table. Meanwhile, Phoebe is sent on a vision quest by a student Enola, who is a young shaman, and gets a glimpse into the demon free future, where she discovers she will have a child and she sees an older Wyatt and a brunette boy. Piper refers to the brunette as Wyatt's little brother. The little boy asks her for help and the vision ends and she sees Chris asking the same question which gives her a revelation. Questioning whether such a future is even possible, she is told she must be herself and accept her bad with the good about who she is and then it can happen—the advice the three sisters give the youth terrorizing the teaching staff. It is revealed that Zachary, a desperately unhappy telepath, is behind the attacks by using his power to tap into others powers. The sisters vanquish the Headless Horseman and convince Zachary to stop. Later at P3, Phoebe confronts Chris about who he really is and asks is he is really Wyatt's brother and thus Piper and Leo's son. For once Chris doesn't lie and confirms this, but only if he can get Piper and Leo back together in time.
| 126 | 15 | "I Dream of Phoebe" | John T. Kretchmer | Curtis Kheel | February 15, 2004 | 62015-06-126 | 4.08 |
Phoebe frees a genie, Jinny (Saba Homayoon), from a bottle, only to find that Jinny is a demon that has tricked her into becoming a genie herself. Anxious to get Leo and Piper back together so he can be conceived, Chris uses Phoebe to make his wish come true, but she takes his instructions too literally. When Chris reveals to Paige that he made the wish to make Piper and Leo sleep together, she calls him a pervert, and he reveals to her that Piper and Leo are his parents and that Piper needs to get pregnant within a few weeks or he will perish. Feeling that he is losing Paige, Richard opportunistically covets the genie's magic and steals the bottle so he can wish Paige back into his life. Paige and Richard reconciled to permanent separation, but Richard must drink a power-stripping potion for his own good.
| 127 | 16 | "The Courtship of Wyatt's Father" | Joel J. Feigenbaum | Brad Kern | February 22, 2004 | 62015-06-127 | 5.01 |
A Darklighter named Damien sends both Leo and Piper into a trap on the ghostly plane where they are without powers and wounds Leo with his Darklighter crossbow, leaving Phoebe and Paige to fear that they are dead. Meanwhile, Chris is obsessing over the fact that he is out of time, for he must be conceived by Piper and Leo sometime in the next day before he disappears forever having never been conceived. An Angel of Death comes for Chris even as he begins fading but he manages to resist and make a communication bridge between Phoebe and Piper. The two consult with Gideon who is convinced Leo is doomed, provides a way to access the dimension to rescue Piper thinking Leo will be dead. At the end he convinces Leo to act as an Elder and sunder himself from his family, and Gideon is revealed to have plotted the cross dimensional attack to rid himself of Leo, and to have ill intentions towards Wyatt, his real target. By being trapped on the ghostly plane causes Piper and Leo to temporarily rekindle their relationship and sleep together, conceiving Chris. Piper learns at the end of the episode that Chris is her son and that she is pregnant from Phoebe and Paige who realize what happened as Chris returns to existence.
| 128 | 17 | "Hyde School Reunion" | Jonathan West | David Simkins | March 14, 2004 | 62015-06-128 | 4.82 |
While preparing for her high school reunion, Phoebe's wild teenage personality takes over her body when she inadvertently casts a spell on herself reading a rhyme she had inscribed in her high school year book. At the reunion, aggravated by an old rival, the teenage Phoebe persona takes over, reconnects with her former gang and finds herself following a suggestion to use her magic to visit another old gang member Rick, who is in jail awaiting trial. Rick, takes advantage of their visit to break out of jail, and uses Phoebe's magic to aid his plans of fleeing justice. Meanwhile, Scabber demons requiring the Power of Three to vanquish are closing in on Chris. Earlier that evening, Piper being increasingly concerned that Chris is staying distant, had asked her father Victor to talk to him. Chris explains that Piper dies when he turns fourteen, and he has been distancing himself from his mother because he believes that to bond with her only to return to a future where she is dead would be too painful. Victor convinces Chris that he needs to spend as much time with Piper as possible so he has more fond memories of her when he goes back. All the while Phoebe is under the dual pressures of knowing one high school friend is seriously, perhaps even grievously wounded, and Rick has hidden one of their female classmates where no-one can ever find her. Both parties arrive back at the manor where Paige casts the appearance changing spell to make him look like Chris. The Scabber Demons spit their acid at what looks like Chris and Rick is melted, but not before he gives up the information on where to find the others.
| 129 | 18 | "Spin City" | Mel Damski | Andy Reaser & Doug E. Jones | April 18, 2004 | 62015-06-129 | 3.86 |
Piper is kidnapped and cocooned by the Spider Demon, a creature that emerges every hundred years to feed off a powerful magical being. During the attack, Chris is infected with the demon's venom, causing him to mutate into a spider demon himself. In need of desperate help, Paige calls Leo. Phoebe then reveals to Leo that Chris is his son. While trying to save him, Chris attacks Leo and starts repeatedly punching Leo, yelling that Leo does not know him. Later, Leo finds Chris on the Golden Gate bridge and begs him to tell him why he hates him so much. Chris replies that Leo was never there for him, but he was there for Piper, Wyatt, and half the world. Leo tells him that maybe he did not come back just to save Wyatt, but to save their relationship as well.
| 130 | 19 | "Crimes and Witch-Demeanors" | John T. Kretchmer | Henry Alonso Myers | April 25, 2004 | 62015-06-130 | 3.40 |
When Phoebe and Paige are caught on tape using their powers by SFPD Inspector Sheridan, the Cleaners, beings who prevent the exposure of magic, cover up the situation by implicating their friend, Detective Darryl Morris, as a murderer and in a huge time jump, end up sending him to death row to cover up the exposure of magic. The Halliwells fight to have the outcome reversed, initially summoning the Cleaners by deliberate acts that would expose magic if left unfixed. Their confrontation proves inconclusive, and they learn that their only recourse is to have a hearing in front of the mysterious Tribunal, which is a council that oversees all magic and made up of demons and Elders with Barbas (Billy Drago) empaneled as the prosecutor. He turns the proceedings around on their head and puts the sisters on trial for recklessly abusing their powers. Meanwhile, Inspector Sheridan, nudged magically by Barbas, takes aim at the sisters with her partner Inspector Miles and begins looking into the trail of disappearances and odd happenings over the last half decade starting with the collection of unsolved homicides SFPD Internal Affairs had harassed Andy Trudeau about. Meanwhile, Leo and Chris work together to help free the sisters and Darryl, but the outcome leaves Phoebe stripped of her active powers as penance for occasional lapses in the past where she used magic to benefit herself.
| 131 | 20 | "A Wrong Day's Journey Into Right" | Derek Johansen | Cameron Litvack | May 2, 2004 | 62015-06-131 | 4.10 |
With Piper away at Magic School and Phoebe without her powers, an overworked Paige re-conjures "Mr. Right" for stress relief, but unknowingly releases his evil twin, a demon called Vincent who immediately hatches a plot to separate the sisters while sending assassins after witches. Appealing to Paige's dark side, Mr. Wrong / Vincent uses his pheromones to trick her into realizing that the only way to achieve her secret desire is to be free and use her magic without fear of consequence, eventually killing her sisters. Chris accidentally gets arrested for stealing a car to chase Vincent and Darryl will not cover. To prevent Paige from executing his plan, Phoebe goes undercover as one of Mr. Wrong's Demonatrix assassins. Paige and Phoebe try to keep Piper out of the situation, but that backfires when Paige, under Vincent's control, kidnaps her so that the Demonatrix assassins can kill her. Phoebe regains confidence in herself when she makes Mr. Right real to test a potion that will make Vincent real so he can be vanquished and infiltrates the Demonatrixes. As the Demonatrixes are about to kill a confused Piper, Phoebe saves her and together they vanquish them. They go after Vincent who is confident they cannot harm him as they do not have the potion to make him real, but Phoebe takes the chance that making Mr. Right real will turn him real too. She proves to be right and Vincent is easily vanquished which breaks his hold over Paige. Later, Leo erases the memory of the car dealership manager to save Chris from having to go to jail.
| 132 | 21 | "Witch Wars" | David Jackson | Krista Vernoff | May 9, 2004 | 62015-06-132 | 2.77 |
Aware that Piper, Phoebe and Paige are on the verge of discovering that he is after Wyatt, Gideon conspires with two demons to make the girls part of Witch Wars, a new demonic reality television show where demon contestants compete to hunt down the Charmed Ones, with the winning demon acquiring the witches' powers. Gideon makes the girls believe that the game masters, Corr and Clea, are the ones after Wyatt in order to protect himself and his own agenda. In the end they find out, but the two demons grow extremely powerful due to them absorbing the powers of vanquished demon contestants. Phoebe comes up with a plan to vanquish them without the Power of Three as they do not want to risk Piper. Leo vanquishes Clea with a power-sucking athame and Phoebe takes Clea's powers for herself. Using her new powers, Phoebe shimmers to the attic and vanquishes Corr with an energy ball. She then shimmers to a demonic bar where demons have been watching Witch Wars and vanquishes many with energy balls to make a point while the rest flee before she returns home. Paige stabs her with the athame to remove the demonic powers. Later, the group celebrates the victory and believe the threat to Wyatt over. Meanwhile, Gideon's assistant has second thoughts about their plan and goes to tell the sisters the truth, but is murdered by Gideon before he can.
| 133 | 22 | "It's a Bad, Bad, Bad, Bad World" | Jon Paré | Jeannine Renshaw | May 16, 2004 | 62015-06-133 | 4.75 |
| 134 | 23 | "It's a Bad, Bad, Bad, Bad World" | Jon Paré | Curtis Kheel | May 16, 2004 | 62015-06-134 | 4.75 |
Under the guise of sending Chris back to the future, Gideon creates a portal that puts Chris and Leo in a mirrored world where evil prevails. Phoebe and Paige travel to the parallel universe to rescue Chris and Leo, only to find themselves in a battle with their evil counterparts. Unable to vanquish one another, both sets of sisters realize that Wyatt is unprotected and in danger from Gideon. Upon returning to their own world, Phoebe and Paige realize that their world is now too good, and every little infraction is a capital offense. The shift between universes causes Piper's memory to be erased, and Gideon tricks Piper into casting a spell on Phoebe and Paige so that they too, forget Gideon's evil intentions. With the Charmed sisters under the spell, and Piper having a complicated delivery, only Leo and Chris are left to stop Gideon from completing his plan. When Chris is left alone with Wyatt in the attic, Gideon attacks just as Chris goes to orb Wyatt out after suspecting something was not right. Gideon summons an athame and disappears. Chris rushes to grab Wyatt, but Gideon reappears and he stabs Chris in the stomach. While Chris lies there wounded, Gideon takes Wyatt to the Underworld. Chris calls out to Leo. When Leo arrives he tries to heal him, but Chris tells him that it will not work because it was Gideon's magic and only he can stop it. He tells Leo to find Gideon and save Wyatt. Unfortunately, Chris dies, sending Leo into a rage. He discovers the inter-dimensional mirror, meets with his analog self and realizes to return balance, a great evil needs to be done in the Charmed One's universe, and when he goes to save Wyatt he kills Gideon while his other self looks on through the mirror which at the end they both destroy, so the universes cannot be linked again in the future. Wyatt is safe, and though future Chris is dead, baby Chris is born healthy.
