= It's a Bad, Bad, Bad, Bad World =

It's a Bad, Bad, Bad, Bad World may refer to:

- It's a Bad, Bad, Bad, Bad World, an episode of Charmed
- It's a Bad Bad Bad Bad World, an episode of The New Three Stooges
