= The Circuit (2008 film) =

- Written by: Bill Hanley; Quinton Peeples
- Directed by: Peter Werner
- Starring: Michelle Trachtenberg; Billy Campbell; Paul Rae; Drew Fuller; Maurice Dean Wint
- Music by: Danny Lux
- Countries of origin: United States; Canada
- Original language: English

Production
- Cinematography: Neil Roach

Original release
- Network: ABC Family
- Release: June 8, 2008

The Circuit is a 2008 American television film starring Michelle Trachtenberg, Billy Campbell, Paul Rae, Drew Fuller and Maurice Dean Wint, originally airing on June 8, 2008, on the ABC Family channel.

== Plot ==
Beautiful Kylie Shines, a rising stock-car racer competes against her estranged father and her new love. The final race is between Kylie and Al and Kid Walker, Walker crashes. Kylie wins.

== Cast ==
- Michelle Trachtenberg as Kylie Shines
- Billy Campbell as Al Shines
- Paul Rae as Robin Cates
- Drew Fuller as "Kid" Walker
- Maurice Dean Wint as Andy "Crash" Davis
- Tommy Lioutas as Jake Miley
- Jeff Pustil as Barney Franklin
