= Voodoo Academy =

- Release poster
- Directed by: David DeCoteau
- Written by: Eric Black
- Produced by: Kirk Edward Hansen; Charles Band (executive producer)
- Starring: Debra Mayer; Riley Smith; Chad Burris; Kevin Calisher; Huntley Ritter; Ben Indra; Drew Fuller; Travis Sher; Rhett Jordan
- Edited by: Tom Vater
- Distributed by: Full Moon Entertainment; Koch Vision
- Release date: 2000
- Running time: 93 min.
- Language: English
- Budget: $55,000 (estimated)

Voodoo Academy is a 2000 Horror/Fantasy film directed by David DeCoteau and starring Debra Mayer, Riley Smith, Chad Burris, Kevin Calisher, Huntley Ritter, Ben Indra, Drew Fuller, Travis Sher, and Rhett Jordan.

== Plot summary ==
Young Christopher has just enrolled at the prestigious Carmichael Bible College, managed by the somewhat unusual Mrs. Bouvier. After some unexplained disappearances, Christopher discovers that Mrs. Bouvier and the Reverend Carmichael have some very bad intentions for the young men of their school. It soon becomes clear that voodoo magic is being used and the boys are the tools with which the college faculty will try to resurrect Satan.

== Cast credits ==
- Debra Mayer as Mrs. Bouvier
- Riley Smith as Christopher Sawyer
- Chad Burris as Reverend Carmichael
- Kevin Calisher as Billy Parker
- Huntley Ritter as Rusty Sankervich
- Ben Indra as Mike McCready
- Drew Fuller as Paul St. Clair
- Travis Sher as Sam Vollero
- Rhett Jordan as Blake Godfrey
