= Sandra Prosper =

Haitian-American actress

- Occupation: Actress
- Website: http://sandraprosper.com/

Sandra Prosper is a Haitian-American actress, best known for her recurring role as Sheila Morris in the TV series Charmed (2003–05) She also was in the 2002 movie Like Mike.

She had guest appearances in Soul Food, CSI: Miami and ER, and a recurring role in First Monday (2002).
