= Drew Fuller =

American actor and former male model

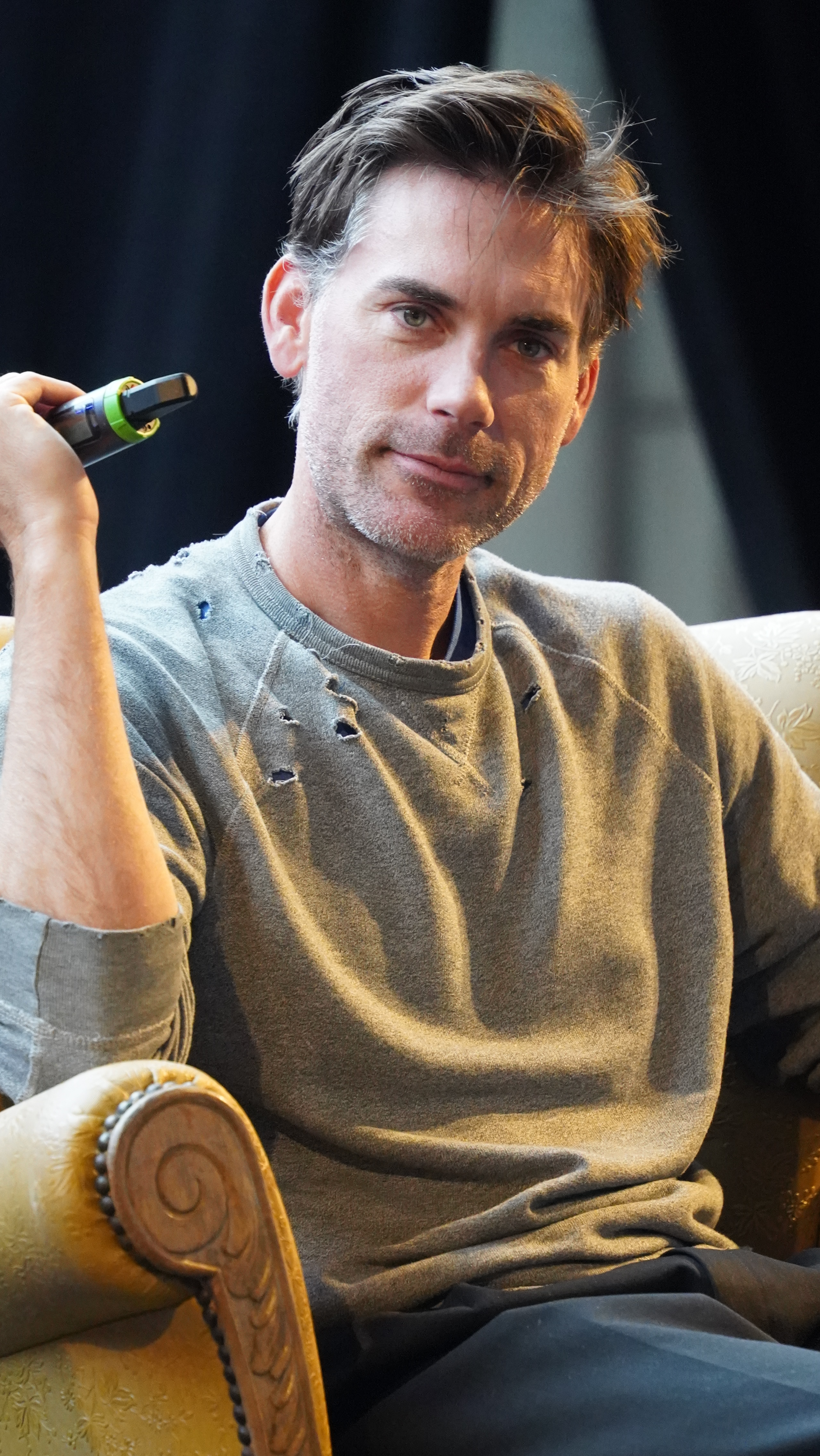
- Fuller in 2023
- Born: Andrew Alan Fuller; May 19, 1980 (age 46); Atherton, California, U.S.
- Occupations: Actor; model; writer
- Years active: 1999–present
- Spouse: Rose Couch (m. 2025)

Andrew Alan Fuller (born May 19, 1980) is an American actor and former model. He is best known for his portrayal of Chris Halliwell in the television series Charmed and for playing soldier Trevor LeBlanc on Lifetime's Army Wives.

== Early life ==
Fuller was born in Atherton, California, and grew up in Newport Beach in family of Russian, Scottish and English descent; he has a younger sister, Hilary.

== Career ==
Fuller got his start in modeling after a family friend put him on the cover of UCLA Magazine. Deciding to wait a few years, Fuller eventually entered the modeling world at age sixteen and quickly became a top model for such companies as Prada, Club Med, and Tommy Hilfiger. He has appeared in many commercials including J.Crew, Subway, Toyota and Pepsi opposite Britney Spears. He took part in the music video for The Calling's "Wherever You Will Go", playing the new boyfriend of the betrayed teenage girl whose relationship is the subject of the video. He also featured in Jennifer Love Hewitt's 2002 music video "BareNaked".

Fuller became known for playing Chris Halliwell on Charmed, a starring and guest star role from seasons 5-8 of the show. In the series, his character is the second son of Piper (Holly Marie Combs) and Leo (Brian Krause) and engages in time travel to save his older brother Wyatt (Wes Ramsey). Fuller's most recent roles are in The Ultimate Gift, a drama released on March 9, 2007, and in the series Army Wives which airs on Lifetime. He also co-starred in ABC Family's television movie The Circuit.

Fuller has finished filming for an independent feature film, The Kane Files: Life of Trial.

Fuller made a cameo in the music video "Tired of Being Sorry" for Balthazar Getty's band Ringside. He also made an appearance in the film Loaded.

Other works: TV commercial for Subway (2003), appears in the pro-WGA strike video on YouTube "Writer Boi" (2007), writer - Bowlerman Begins (short) (2010).

== Filmography ==
=== Film ===
Year	Title	Role	Notes
2000	Voodoo Academy	Paul St. Clair	Direct-to-video
2001	One	Cole	Short Film
2001	Backflash 2: Angels Don't Sleep Here	Teenage Jesse	
2002	Vampire Clan	Rod Ferrell	
2003	Close Call	Sam	
2005	Final Contract: Death on Delivery	David Glover	
2006	The Ultimate Gift	Jason Stevens	
2007	Numbered with the Dead	Tommy 'Two Toes' Garelli	Direct-to-Video
2007	Blonde Ambition	Billy	
2008	Loaded	Brendan	
2010	The Kane Files: Life of Trial	Scott Kane	Award: Won – Best Actor, at San Diego Film Festival
2014	Fatal Instinct	Danny Gates	
2015	The Night Before	Sean	
2015	Love Finds You in Charm	Andy	
2017	Beyond Brotherhood	Dr. Chris Vianni	
2018	Magnetic Plasma for mass(es) Enlightenment	Bodhi	Short Film
2020	Patricia Sterling	Director	Short film
2023	Holiday Twist	Bill Neilson	

=== Television ===
Year	Title	Role	Notes
1999	Partners	Tom	Unsold TV pilot (aka. "My Sister, My Enemy")
2002	Home of the Brave	Justin Briggs	TV film
2003	Black Sash	Nick Reed	Episodes: "Prime Suspect", "The Prodigal Son", "Date Night"
2003	The O.C.	Norland	Episode: "Pilot"
2003–2006	Charmed	Chris Halliwell	Main role (season 6); guest role (seasons 5, 7–8); 25 episodes
2006	Huff	Josh	Episode: "A Cornfield Grows in L.A."
2007–2012	Army Wives	Trevor LeBlanc	Main role (seasons 1–6); special guest star (season 7)
2008	The Circuit	Kid Walker	TV film
2011	NCIS: Los Angeles	Conner Maslin	Episode: "Honor"
2014	Perfect On Paper	Coop	TV film (Hallmark)
2015	Longmire	Noah	Episode: "Four Arrows"
2016	Dispatch	Tim	TV film; also known as 911 Nightmare
2017	A Bunch of Dicks	Anders	TV Mini-Series
2018	All Wrong	Branderson	Episode: "You Can Find Me at the Club "
2019	Love, Fall, and Order	Ben	TV film (Hallmark)
2023	The Rookie	Oliver	Episode: "The Naked and The Dead"

=== Internet ===
Year	Title	Role	Notes
2014	Funny or Die	Jay Penske	Episode: The Nikki Finke Story
2022–2023	House of Halliwell	Podcaster. Lead role	Podcast
2024-present	House of Halliwell	Podcaster. Lead role	Podcast

=== Music video appearances ===
Year	Artist	Song
2001	The Calling	"Wherever You Will Go"
2002	Jennifer Love Hewitt	"BareNaked"
2005	Lindsay Lohan	"Over"
2005	Ringside	"Tired of Being Sorry"
2006	Sara Groves	"Something Changed"
2006	Ed Goggin	"Legacy"
