= Brian Krause =

American actor (born 1969)

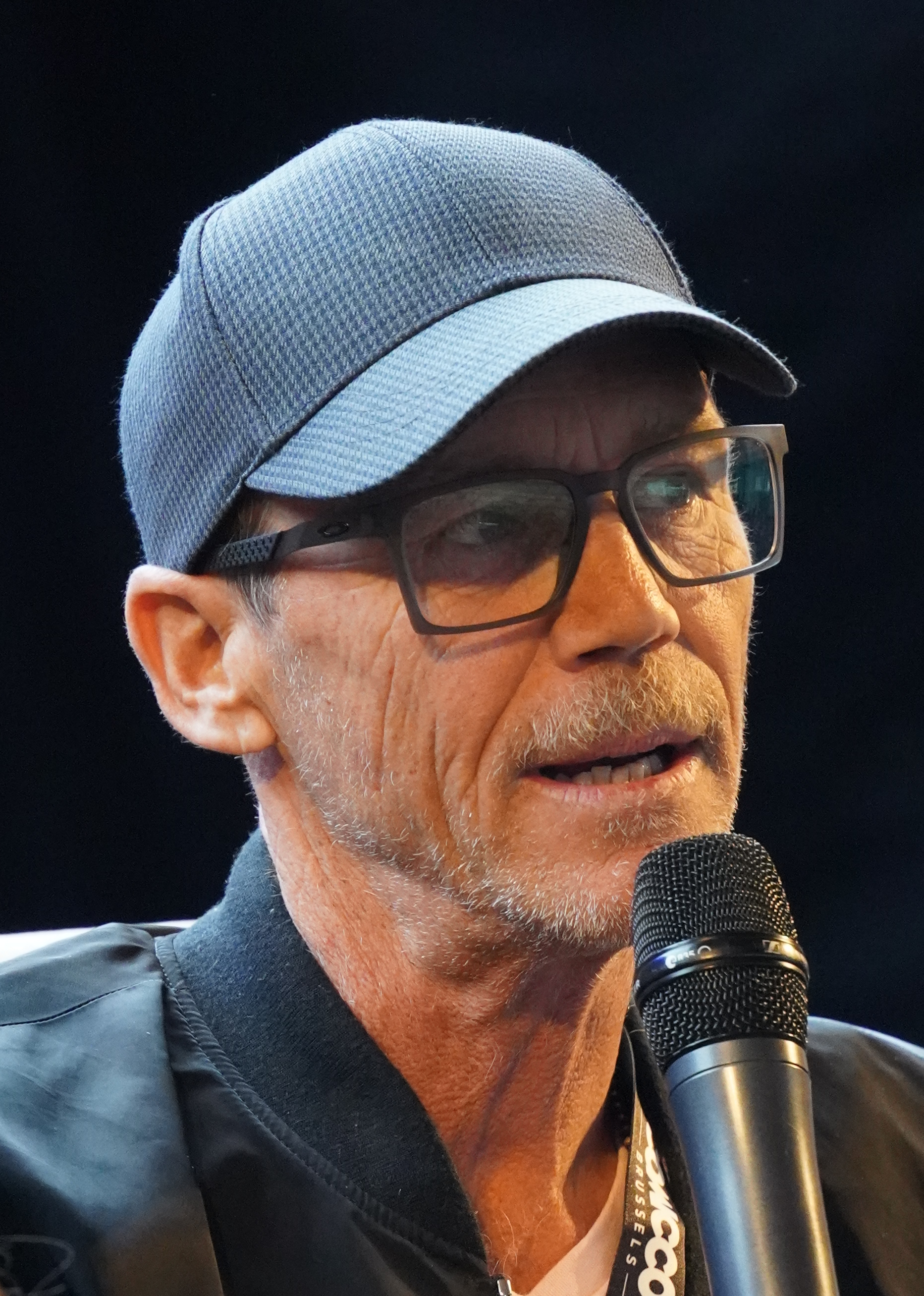
- Krause in 2023
- Born: Brian Jeffrey Krause; February 1, 1969 (age 57); El Toro, California, United States
- Occupation: Actor
- Years active: 1989–present
- Spouse: Beth Bruce (m. 1996–2000)
- Children: 1

Brian Jeffrey Krause (born February 1, 1969) is an American actor. He is known for his role as Leo Wyatt on The WB television series Charmed (1998–2006) and for portraying the lead role of Charles Brady in the 1992 horror film Sleepwalkers.

== Early life ==
Krause was born in El Toro, California, the son of Alice and Jeff Krause. He has a brother named Patrick. Krause was adopted. He grew up in Southern California and took his first acting class at The Actors Workshop while in junior high. In his teens, he studied karate and attended El Toro High School, where he graduated in 1987. He continued his education at Orange Coast College.

== Career ==
Krause landed his first role in 1989 as a student in the TV series TV 101. He then starred in the made-for-TV-movie Match Point, the CBS Schoolbreak Special "American Eyes", and An American Summer, before landing his first major role as Richard Lestrange, Jr. in the film Return to the Blue Lagoon (1991). He was a co-star in the Bandit series prior to his most notable role of Leo Wyatt, in The WB Network series Charmed (1998–2006). Krause originally auditioned for the role of Andy Trudeau but was cast as Piper's handyman/whitelighter love interest.

Due to budget restrictions in the eighth season (2005–06), he only appeared in the first 10 episodes and last two episodes. After Charmed, he has appeared in made-for-TV-movies and TV shows such as Mad Men (episode 2x12 The Mountain King), The Closer (episode 4x01 Controlled Burn), and Castle (episode 3x03 Under the Gun). He lent his voice and image to portray a minor character (Clem Feeney) in the videogame L.A. Noire, and he appeared in the YouTube video series Chad Vader, in Season 4, Episode 4: "The Return of Brian" (uploaded July 10, 2012), as himself, a former employee of Empire Market.

He starred as Ben in the 2012 film Ben and Becca, directed by Victor Alferi, written and produced by Bibi Amos, who also starred as Becca.

== Filmography ==
=== Film ===
Year	Title	Role	Notes
1989	Match Point	Bart	TV movie
1990	An American Summer	Joey	
1991	Earth Angel	Mike	TV movie
1991	Return to the Blue Lagoon	Richard Lestrange, Jr.	
1991	December	Tim Mitchell	
1992	Sleepwalkers	Charles Brady	
1994	Bandit Goes Country	Lynn	TV movie
1994	Bandit Bandit	Lynn	TV movie
1994	Beauty and the Bandit	Lynn	TV movie
1994	Bandit's Silver Angel	Lynn	TV movie
1994	The Liars' Club	Pat	
1995	919 Fifth Avenue	Court Van Degen	TV movie
1995	Breaking Free	Clay Nelson	
1996	Naked Souls	Edward	
1996	Within the Rock	Luke Harrison	TV movie
1996	Mind Games	Matt Jarvis	
1998	Get a Job	Mike	
1999	Dreamers	Pete	
1999	Trash	Will Fowler	
2000	The Party	The Husband	Short
2001	Return to Cabin by the Lake	Mike Helton	TV movie
2004	To Kill a Mockumentary	Danson	Video
2005	Pissed	Jay	
2005	The Mission	Jack	Short
2006	Ties That Bind	David	TV movie
2007	Protecting the King	Jeff	
2007	Devil's Diary	Father Mark Mulligan	
2008	Beyond Loch Ness	James Murphy	TV movie
2008	Triloquist	Detective Kislow	
2008	Warbirds	Col. Jack Toller	TV movie
2008	Jack Rio	Billy Rafferty	
2008	Desertion	Brandon	
2009	The Gods of Circumstance	Jim Jeff Jones	
2009	Nowhere to Hide	Edward Crane	
2009	2012: Supernova	Kelvin	Video
2009	Chamber of Worlds	Raider Trevor Gantry	Short
2010	Growth	Marco	
2010	You're So Cupid	Daniel Valentine	
2010	Cyrus: Mind of a Serial Killer	Cyrus	
2010	The Binds That Tie Us	Marion Winston	Short
2010	Ashes	Andrew Stanton	
2010	Next Stop Murder	Jeff	TV movie
2010	Cupid's Hot Dogs	-	Short
2011	Camel Spiders	Captain Mike Sturges	
2011	Absolute Killers	Vince	
2012	Gabe the Cupid Dog	Eric	
2012	Stalked at 17	Mark	TV movie
2012	Retribution	Det. Frank Neaman	TV movie
2012	Ben and Becca	Ben	Short
2013	Coffin Baby: Toolbox Murders 2	Detective Chad Cole	
2013	Alien Rising	Plummer	
2013	Haunted Maze	Benedict Killer	
2013	Poseidon Rex	Jackson 'Jax' Slate	
2013	Christmas for a Dollar	William Kamp	
2013	Rain from Stars	John	
2014	Random Stop	Andrew Brannan	Short
2014	Red Sky	Michael Banks	
2014	Expecting Amish	Mr. Yoder	TV movie
2014	Christmas Switch	Eddie Bennett	
2014	Borrowed Moments	Ben	
2014	The Studio Club	Matt Forester	
2014	The Monogamy Experiment Short	-	Short
2015	Plan 9	Jeff Trent	
2015	Hot Girls	Boss	Short
2015	Miracle Maker	James Booth	
2016	Ribbons	Kenny Bishop	TV movie
2016	His Double Life	Greg	TV movie
2016	Earthtastrophe	Danny	TV movie
2016	House of Purgatory	The Skeleton	
2017	Be Afraid	Dr. John Chambers	
2017	A Woman Deceived	Detective Morrison	TV movie
2017	The Killing Pact	Detective Marcs	TV movie
2018	Party Mom	Gary	TV movie
2018	Cucuy: The Boogeyman	Kieran Martin	
2019	The Demonologist	Damian	
2019	Underdog	Dallas	
2019	Trauma Therapy	Arthur	
2020	Retreat to Paradise	Neal Terry	TV movie
2020	Red Light	Stephen	Short
2020	Scarlett	Cal Sutton	
2020	Becky	Becky's Dad	Short
2021	Hollywood.Con	The Director	
2021	Secrets in the Water	Sheriff Douglas	TV movie
2021	Uploaded	Captain Ortiz	
2022	Basement	Jake	
2022	Harmony in Paradise	Timothy	TV movie
2023	Homestead	Robert	
2023	Breakout	Max Chandler	
2024	The Windigo	Sheriff Bradley Elkins	
2024	Deadly Justice	Dale Jones	
2024	Slay Ride - The Movie	Det. Donner	
2025	Beauty of Poverty	Lucas	

=== Television ===
Year	Title	Role	Notes
1989	TV 101	Student	Episode: "Kangaroo Gate"
1989	Highway to Heaven	Boy #2	Episode: "Goodbye, Mr. Zelinka"
1989–1990	Ann Jillian	Tom	Episodes: "Love: 15" & "The Crush"
1990	CBS Schoolbreak Special	Matt Henderson	Episode: "American Eyes"
1993	Tales from the Crypt	Tex Crandall	Episode: "House of Horror"
1994	Family Album	Greg Thayer	Episode: "Part 1 & 2"
1995	Walker, Texas Ranger	Billy Kramer	Episode: "Collision Course"
1996	High Tide	Scott Wilson	Episode: "Killshot"
1997–1998	Another World	Matt Cory	Regular Cast; 33 episodes
1998–2006	Charmed	Leo Wyatt	Main Cast (seasons 1–8); 145 episodes
2007	CSI: Miami	Robert Whitten	Episode: "Cyber-lebrity"
2008	The Closer	Tom Merrick	Episode: "Controlled Burn"
2008	Mad Men	Kess	Episode: "The Mountain King"
2010	Castle	Father Aaron Lowe	Episode: "Under The Gun"
2012	The Unknown	Paul Baker	Episode: "Yesterday"
2014	Dark Rising: Warrior of Worlds	Bob Danton	Recurring Cast; 4 episodes
2016	Turn Back Time	Trevor Haas	Main Cast; 9 episodes
2018	Dynasty	George	Episode: "The Butler Did It"
2021	Cypher	Robert	Main Cast; 7 episodes
2022	S.W.A.T.	Josip	Episode: "Albatross"
2024	Die Hart	Roger Richards	Episode: "The Vacuum Repairman from Sarasota"

=== Internet ===
Year	Title	Role	Notes
2022–2023	House of Halliwell	Podcaster. Lead role	Podcast
2024-present	House of Halliwell	Podcaster. Lead role	Podcast

=== Music videos ===
Year	Title	Artist	Role
2012	"Shadow"	Auradrone	Ego
2013	"Ad Lucem"	Queensrÿche	Himself

=== Video games ===
Year	Title	Role	Ref.
2004	CSI: Miami	Robert Winton	
2011	L.A. Noire	Clem Feeney	
2018	Fallout 76	Mitchell Hibbs, Watoga High School P.A., Trapped Responder, Additional Voices	
