= Immortal Universe =

Shared fictional universe and media franchise

Anne Rice's Immortal Universe
- Promotional title card
- Original work: Interview with the Vampire (2022)
- Owner: AMC Networks
- Years: 2022–present
- Based on: The Vampire Chronicles and Lives of the Mayfair Witches by Anne Rice

Films and television
- Television series: Interview with the Vampire; Mayfair Witches; Talamasca: The Secret Order

Audio
- Soundtrack(s): Interview with the Vampire (Original Television Series Soundtrack)

Anne Rice's Immortal Universe, or simply the Immortal Universe, is an American media franchise and shared universe centered on the 2020s AMC television series adaptations of Anne Rice's Vampire Chronicles and Lives of the Mayfair Witches supernatural horror novel series. The books, which originated with the 1976 novel Interview with the Vampire, follow vampires and witches in the ancient and modern world. The franchise includes three television series: Interview with the Vampire, Mayfair Witches, and Talamasca: The Secret Order, with other projects in development.

Talamasca: The Secret Order premiered in October 2025, focused on the Talamasca, a secret society in Rice's novels who investigate the paranormal. Night Island, an upcoming six-part short-form digital series centered on a luxury resort for vampires, was based on elements of Rice's 1988 novel The Queen of the Damned, and follows the attempted theft of a painting from the island by a pair of burglars who are unaware of the supernatural nature of its inhabitants. An adaptation of Memnoch the Devil is also in development.

AMC coined the term "Immortal Universe" with the October 2022 release of its Interview with the Vampire series. Notable characters in the Immortal Universe include the vampires Lestat de Lioncourt and Louis de Pointe du Lac, the witch Rowan Mayfair, and paranormal investigator and empath Ciprien Grieve.

== History ==
Novels from Rice's The Vampire Chronicles were previously adapted in the films Interview with the Vampire (1994) and Queen of the Damned (2002). In August 2014, Universal Pictures and Imagine Entertainment acquired the motion picture rights to the entire Vampire Chronicles series, with producers Alex Kurtzman and Roberto Orci signed to helm the potential film franchise. In May 2016, it was reported that writer–director Josh Boone and Jill Killington had completed a script adapting Rice's Interview with the Vampire (1976) and its sequel, The Vampire Lestat (1985).

In November 2016, Rice announced that the theatrical rights to her novels had reverted to her, and that she and her son, writer Christopher Rice, would be developing and executive producing a potential television series based on her works. In April 2017, they teamed up with Paramount Television and Anonymous Content to develop a series, and in early 2018, Bryan Fuller joined the project. On July 17, 2018, it was announced that the series was in development at streaming service Hulu, and that Fuller had departed the production. By December 2019, Hulu's rights had expired, and Rice was shopping a package combining film and TV rights to both The Vampire Chronicles and her related Lives of the Mayfair Witches series. Rice was reportedly asking around $30 to $40 million, plus a $2.5 million buyout of Warner Bros.' rights, and the new owner would hold the rights in perpetuity, not just as an option.

In May 2020, it was announced that AMC Studios had acquired the rights to The Vampire Chronicles and Lives of the Mayfair Witches for developing film and television projects. Rice and her son would serve as executive producers on any projects developed. Rice said, "It's always been my dream to see the worlds of my two biggest series united under a single roof so that filmmakers could explore the expansive and interconnected universe of my vampires and witches. That dream is now a reality, and the result is one of the most significant and thrilling deals of my long career." Rice died in December 2021.

AMC coined the term "Immortal Universe" with the October 2022 release of its Interview with the Vampire series. A second series, Mayfair Witches, debuted in January 2023.

The studio created a custom font called Immortal Gothic for the franchise.

== Television series ==
Three television series make up the Immortal Universe franchise: Interview with the Vampire, Mayfair Witches, and Talamasca: The Secret Order. All series in total amount to 44 episodes across six seasons of television.

Series	Season	Episodes	Originally released		Showrunner(s)	Status
Series	Season	Episodes	First released	Last released	Showrunner(s)	Status
Interview with the Vampire	1	7	October 2, 2022	November 13, 2022	Rolin Jones	Released
Interview with the Vampire	2	8	May 12, 2024	June 30, 2024	Rolin Jones	Released
Interview with the Vampire	3	7	June 7, 2026	July 19, 2026	Rolin Jones	Released
Interview with the Vampire	4	TBA	TBA	TBA	Hannah Moscovitch	In development
Mayfair Witches	1	8	January 8, 2023	February 26, 2023	Esta Spalding	Released
Mayfair Witches	2	8	January 5, 2025	March 2, 2025	Esta Spalding	Released
Mayfair Witches	3	8	December 30, 2026	TBA	Esta Spalding & Thomas Schnauz	Post-production
Talamasca: The Secret Order	1	6	October 26, 2025	November 23, 2025	John Lee Hancock and Mark Lafferty	Concluded
Night Island	1	6	TBA	TBA	Jonathan Ceniceroz	In development

=== Interview with the Vampire (2022) ===
In June 2021, it was announced that AMC had given a series order for Interview with the Vampire, a television adaptation of the first half of Rice's 1976 novel, executive produced by Rolin Jones and Mark Johnson. On September 28, 2022, ahead of the series premiere, AMC renewed Interview with the Vampire for a second season which covered the second half of the novel. The series was renewed for a third season in June 2024. Although marketed and branded as a separate series within the Immortal Universe, titled The Vampire Lestat, the third season of Interview with the Vampire adapts the titular second novel in the series.

The first season premiered on AMC on October 2, 2022, with an advance release three days earlier on the network's streaming service, AMC+.

The series stars Sam Reid as 18th century French vampire Lestat de Lioncourt, Jacob Anderson as his lover, Louis de Pointe du Lac, Eric Bogosian as modern-day journalist Daniel Molloy, and Assad Zaman as ancient vampire Armand. Teenage vampire Claudia is portrayed by Bailey Bass in season one, and by Delainey Hayles in season two. New characters introduced in season two include Ben Daniels as the vampire Santiago, and Roxane Duran as Madeleine.

In the story, rakish vampire Lestat comes to 1910 New Orleans and seduces brothel owner Louis, who consents to being made a vampire himself. But Louis struggles with the killing of, and isolation from, humans that his survival now requires, and he grows apart from Lestat. Louis forms a bond with young vampire Claudia, but she proves to be impulsive and reckless, endangering their already fragile family unit.

Ancillary material to the first season of Interview with the Vampire included Obsessed with the Vampire, a digital post-show discussion about each new episode, and a podcast in which host Naomi Ekperigin is joined by the actors and writers from the series.

=== Mayfair Witches (2023) ===
In December 2021, it was reported that AMC had given a series order for Mayfair Witches, a television adaptation of Rice's 1990 novel The Witching Hour, written and executive produced by Esta Spalding and Michelle Ashford, and executive produced by Mark Johnson. The Interview with the Vampire series was already in production, but had not yet aired. Mayfair Witches premiered on AMC and AMC+ on January 8, 2023. On February 3, 2023, AMC renewed the series for a second season. In April 2025, the series was renewed for a third season.

The series stars Alexandra Daddario as neurosurgeon Rowan Mayfair, Harry Hamlin as wealthy patriarch Cortland Mayfair, Tongayi Chirisa as Talamasca agent and empath Ciprien Grieve, and Jack Huston as the malevolent spirit Lasher. Recurring roles include Annabeth Gish as Rowan's birth mother Deirdre Mayfair, Beth Grant as Rowan's great aunt Carlotta Mayfair, Erica Gimpel as Rowan's adopted mother Ellie Mayfair and Jen Richards as Cortland's daughter Jojo Mayfair.

In the story, Rowan is shocked to learn she is the heiress to a dynasty of powerful witches haunted by a sinister entity called Lasher. As she uncovers the secrets of her new family and learns her true nature, she is surveilled, and soon assisted, by an agent of a mysterious organization called the Talamasca.

=== Talamasca: The Secret Order (2025) ===
In April 2023, it was announced that AMC was developing a third Immortal Universe series focused on the Talamasca, a secret society featured in Rice's Vampire Chronicles and Mayfair Witches series. In June 2024, it was reported that AMC had greenlit the series, titled Anne Rice's Talamasca: The Secret Order, set to be written and executive produced by showrunners John Lee Hancock and Mark Lafferty. Principal photography for the first season began in the Autumn of 2024 in Manchester, England. In September, it was announced that Nicholas Denton would portray Guy Anatole. Later that month, it was announced that William Fichtner would portray Jasper and that Elizabeth McGovern would portray Helen. By October, production had begun. In November, it was announced that Maisie Richardson-Sellers had joined the cast as Olive. The series premiered on AMC and AMC+ on October 26, 2025. In March 2026, it was announced that the series had been canceled after one season.

=== Future series ===
In April 2023, AMC announced Night Island, a six-part short-form digital series written by Jonathan Ceniceroz. Centered on a luxury resort for vampires featured in Rice's 1988 novel The Queen of the Damned, the series will follow the attempted theft of a painting from the island by a pair of burglars who are unaware of the supernatural nature of its inhabitants. In September 2025, Night Island was confirmed to still be in development, along with the announcement of an adaptation of Memnoch the Devil.

== Recurring cast and characters ==
List indicator

This section includes characters who will appear or have appeared in at least two series.

- A green cell indicates the actor is a main cast member.
- A red cell indicates the actor is a recurring cast member.
- A light blue cell indicates the actor is a guest or special guest cast member.

Cast and characters of Immortal Universe series
Character	Cast member	Television series		
Character	Cast member	Interview with the Vampire	Mayfair Witches	Talamasca: The Secret Order
Lestat de Lioncourt	Sam Reid	Main		Guest (Note: Singing "Long Face" on the radio.)
Daniel Molloy	Eric Bogosian	Main		Guest
Felix	Gabriel Freilich	Guest	Guest	
Raglan James	Justin Kirk	Guest		Guest

== Reception ==
=== Critical response ===
Critical response of Immortal Universe franchise series
Title	Season	Rotten Tomatoes	Metacritic
Interview with the Vampire	1	98% (84 reviews)	80 (30 reviews)
Interview with the Vampire	2	100% (77 reviews)	89 (14 reviews)
Interview with the Vampire	3	100% (36 reviews)	88 (11 reviews)
Mayfair Witches	1	47% (36 reviews)	47 (13 reviews)
Mayfair Witches	2	71% (7 reviews)	63 (2 reviews)
Talamasca: The Secret Order	1	61% (23 reviews)	63 (15 reviews)
