= Talamasca =

Fictional secret society

- The Vampire Chronicles; Lives of the Mayfair Witches; organization
- First appearance: The Queen of the Damned (1988)
- Created by: Anne Rice
- Genre: Horror fiction
- Key people: David Talbot; Jesse Reeves; Aaron Lightner; Merrick Mayfair; Ciprien Grieve
- Purpose: Research,
- Motto: We watch. And we are always there.

The Talamasca, sometimes known as the Order of the Talamasca, is a fictional secret society featured in Anne Rice's Vampire Chronicles and Lives of the Mayfair Witches supernatural horror novel series.

It is described as a secret society set up to research, investigate, observe and monitor the paranormal, in particular, vampires, witches, spirits and werewolves. Rice describes them as "psychic detectives". Many vampiric characters from Rice's novels once belonged to the Talamasca before accepting the "dark gift". Jesse Reeves, David Talbot and Merrick Mayfair are the best known of Rice's Talamasca characters.

The Talamasca represents one strand of Rice's theme of anthropology in her work which she repeatedly returns to. There are a number of anthropologists in, or connected with the Talamasca. The Talamasca can itself be seen as a kind of parallel to physical anthropology, looking for artifacts of another world. This is especially clear in the Talamasca's secret search for the Taltos. The Talamasca provides a solid foundation for Rice's work. With a history going back centuries it is like a backbone going through Rice's work which makes it coherent within itself.

== History in Rice's works ==
Introduced in The Queen of the Damned (1988), the Talamasca is said to have formed in 758 by Teskhamen, Heskreth and Gremt, and though it operates in offices worldwide, the organization's central files are held in London.

In the novel Prince Lestat it is revealed to the vampire Pandora and Arjun that the founder of the Talamasca is the spirit Pandora encountered upon the death of Cassiodorus. The leader at that time is David Talbot, who spearheaded its growth at the end of the twentieth century. Earlier in the Vampire Chronicles, the society was sent to New Orleans to uncover the truth behind the story told in Interview with the Vampire (1976).

== Characters ==
Character	The Queen of the Damned (1988)	The Witching Hour (1990)	The Tale of the Body Thief (1992)	Lasher (1993)	Taltos (1994)	Memnoch the Devil (1995)	The Vampire Armand (1998)	Merrick (2000)	Blood and Gold (2001)	Blackwood Farm (2002)	Prince Lestat (2014)	Prince Lestat and the Realms of Atlantis (2016)	Blood Communion (2018)	Portrayals in media	
Character	The Queen of the Damned (1988)	The Witching Hour (1990)	The Tale of the Body Thief (1992)	Lasher (1993)	Taltos (1994)	Memnoch the Devil (1995)	The Vampire Armand (1998)	Merrick (2000)	Blood and Gold (2001)	Blackwood Farm (2002)	Prince Lestat (2014)	Prince Lestat and the Realms of Atlantis (2016)	Blood Communion (2018)	Queen of the Damned (2002 film)	Mayfair Witches (2023 TV series)
David Talbot	Yes		Yes			Yes	Yes	Yes			Yes	Yes	Yes	Paul McGann	
Jessica "Jesse" Reeves	Yes										Yes		Yes	Marguerite Moreau	
Aaron Lightner (Note: Aaron Lightner also appears in the Lives of the Mayfair Witches trilogy (1990–1994).)	Yes	Yes		Yes	Yes			Yes							Tongayi Chirisa (as Ciprien Grieve)
Merrick Mayfair								Yes		Yes					
Teskhamen									Yes		Yes	Yes	Yes		
Stirling Oliver										Yes					

== Television series ==
In April 2023, it was reported that AMC was developing a third Immortal Universe television series focused on the Talamasca. John Lee Hancock is attached to the project as showrunner and writer. Talamasca: The Secret Order had begun production by October 2024 and premiered in 2025.
