= Talamasca: The Secret Order =

2025 American horror television series

- Promotional poster
- Also known as: Anne Rice's Talamasca: The Secret Order
- Genre: Horror; Supernatural; Spy thriller; Drama
- Created by: John Lee Hancock
- Based on: The Vampire Chronicles by Anne Rice
- Showrunners: John Lee Hancock; Mark Lafferty
- Starring: Nicholas Denton; Celine Buckens; Maisie Richardson-Sellers; William Fichtner; Elizabeth McGovern
- Music by: Natalie Holt
- Country of origin: United States
- No. of seasons: 1
- No. of episodes: 6

Production
- Executive producers: Anne Rice; Christopher Rice; Tom Williams; Mark Johnson; Mark Lafferty; John Lee Hancock
- Producer: Mark Murdoch
- Cinematography: John Schwartzman; Stijn Van der Veken; Laurie Rose
- Editors: Mike Phillips; Joel Pashby; Maria Gonzales
- Running time: 51–60 minutes
- Production companies: Steady State Productions; Takes All Kinds Films; Gran Via Productions; AMC Studios

Original release
- Network: AMC
- Release: October 19 – November 23, 2025

Related
- Immortal Universe

Anne Rice's Talamasca: The Secret Order, or simply Talamasca: The Secret Order, is an American supernatural horror spy thriller drama television series created by John Lee Hancock that is based on the titular clandestine organization from Anne Rice's novels, specifically the Vampire Chronicles and Lives of the Mayfair Witches series.

Talamasca: The Secret Order is the third television series set in the Immortal Universe, a shared universe based on Rice's novels, which started in 2022 with Interview with the Vampire. Talamasca: The Secret Order premiered on AMC on October 19, 2025. In March 2026, the series was canceled after one season.

== Premise ==
Talamasca: The Secret Order follows Guy Anatole, a psychic who can hear other people's thoughts. He is approached by Helen, a mysterious woman who works for the Talamasca, a secret society that monitors and controls the activity of supernatural beings (such as vampires, demons, witches and ghosts) to maintain equilibrium between the mortal and supernatural worlds. After he joins the organization as an off-the-books secret agent, he is sent to London to investigate the vampire Jasper, who has infiltrated the London Motherhouse.

== Cast and characters ==
=== Main ===
- Nicholas Denton as Guy Anatole, a telepath with the ability to read the thoughts and memories of almost everyone, who is recruited by Helen to join the Talamasca in order to investigate Jasper.
- Celine Buckens as Doris, an ally to Guy who gets involved with Guy’s investigation of Jasper.
- Maisie Richardson-Sellers as Olive, a Talamasca agent and Guy's handler.
- William Fichtner as Jasper, a vampire who controls Talamasca's London Motherhouse and who is out for revenge against the entirety of the Talamasca for their part in the death of his coven.
- Elizabeth McGovern as Helen, the leader of Talamasca's New York Motherhouse who recruits and assists Guy.

=== Recurring ===
- Tomi May as Highsmith
- Will Brown as Checkers, a mindless non-speaking revenant under the control of Jasper
- Bryony Hannah as Ridge, a detective investigating the murders in London
- Jonathan Aris as Owen

=== Guest ===
- Justin Kirk as Raglan James, a mysterious, shady, and self-serving rogue member of the Talamasca, who gets involved in Guy’s investigation. Kirk reprises his role from the second season of Interview with the Vampire.
- Sam Reid as Lestat de Lioncourt (voice cameo, uncredited): A powerful vampire whose rock music track "Long Face" is briefly heard playing on the radio inside a pub during the fifth episode. Reid reprises his role from Interview with the Vampire, providing vocals, with the song also featured in that show's third season, The Vampire Lestat.

=== Special guest stars ===
- Eric Bogosian as Daniel Molloy, a cynical journalist in his 70s with Parkinson's disease who was turned into a vampire after the events of the second season of Interview with the Vampire, and released a tell-all book trying to expose the existence of vampires to the public. Bogosian reprises his role from Interview with the Vampire.
- Jason Schwartzman as Burton, a charming Vampire informant to the Talamasca, who tells Guy to be careful working with them

== Episodes ==
No.	Title	Directed by	Written by	Original release date	U.S. viewers (millions)
1	"We Watch. And We Are Always There."	John Lee Hancock	John Lee Hancock	October 19, 2025 (Note: A special preview of the premiere episode aired on AMC before the official October 26, 2025, premiere.)	N/A
Pursued by the vampire Jasper, Talamasca agent Soledad Marcel hides confidential files before letting herself be hit by a train. Investigating the circumstances surrounding the event, Talamasca New York leader Helen attempts to recruit apprehensive telepath Guy Anatole. Guy is shown distressed by the headaches that come with his power, using pills to numb its effects, and simply wants to pursue a normal law career. Investigating the Talamasca brings Guy to the realization that the group has been monitoring him and his power his whole life. Helen brings Guy along to speak with the vampire Burton, who acts as an informant for the Talamasca. Through their conversation, Burton provides valuable information to Helen in regards to the case while frightening Guy and warning him to not trust the Talamasca. Undeterred, Guy uncovers his mother’s name in the Interview with the Vampire book by, recently turned vampire, journalist Daniel Molloy. Daniel tells Guy that her name was put in the book by the Talamasca themselves. Guy eventually finds a recent photo of his mother, leading to him confronting Helen. Meanwhile, Jasper is shown in a basement torturing a man, while controlling revenant creatures.
2	"A Wilderness of Mirrors"	John Lee Hancock	John Lee Hancock	October 26, 2025	0.172
Wanting to find more information on his mother, Guy accepts Helen’s mission, forgoing his law career and moving to London to investigate a mysterious hitman by the name of Archie. Upon arrival, Guy acts undercover working as a barker outside a strip club, handing out flyers while in secret uncovering more information to serve in his investigation. Meanwhile, Police Officer Ridge begins investigating the circumstances of Soledad’s death, believing those circumstances to be suspicious. It is additionally revealed that Jasper holds control over the London Talamasca branch, manipulating the cancer stricken Talamasca London leader Greg Owen through healing blood. Eventually, at a bar, Guy meets and falls for Kevis, a woman holding a mysterious book. After briefly meeting a mysterious second woman at a dance club who bewitches both of them briefly, Guy and Kevis sleep together. Kevis vanishes in the morning, while Guy tracks Archie to a hotel meeting, which leads to Guy being psychically confronted by Jasper who senses his ability. Guy follows Archie all the way to an apartment block, which before he can enter is suddenly violently attacked by an unknown being. Upon entering, Guy finds Archie’s neck sliced and Kevis hanged to death in front of him.
3	"The Task at Hand"	Eva Sørhaug	Donald Joh & Vinnie Wilhelm	November 2, 2025	0.211
The police arrive on the scene of the murders just as Guy leaves, finding evidence linking back to him that they choose to investigate further. With Guy blaming Helen for Kevis’ death, Helen reveals that the mysterious woman at the dance club was Olive Farrington, Guy’s handler, and that Kevis was secretly part of a witch coven. She reveals that his real mission in London is to find the secret hidden book--the 752--which holds ancient hidden knowledge of the Talamasca which seemingly was wiped out years ago and could pose a threat to the Talamasca if left unchecked, most notably by Jasper who wishes to use that knowledge against them. Believing the book Kevis held was the 752, Guy speaks to Doris, Kevis’ close friend, who starts out apprehensive towards him for his involvement with Talamasca and warns him to stay away, but then eventually opens up to him about her time with Kevis. Guy meets back with Helen, who expresses her backstory of experimentation at the hands of Talamasca and how her sister was ripped away from her for her own witch abilities. The two of them come to an understanding and Guy is moved but still chooses to continue his investigation on his own. Guy meets with Jasper, telling him that he wishes to help him go after the Talamasca. Jasper is humored by the request but insists that Guy not go away.
4	"Wet Work"	Eva Sørhaug	Anna Fisher & Mark Lafferty	November 9, 2025	N/A
In a stingy hotel apartment, an elderly dried out vampire is experimented and has his blood taken out of him. Jasper explains his hatred of the Talamasca to Guy; in the 1920s, he was a human member of a vampire cult which was slaughtered by a rival vampire, given information by the Talamasca. After becoming a vampire, Jasper chose to seek revenge against them, intending to use the 752 to destroy them once and for all. The two sympathize over their pasts as Jasper details a location where he was able to find a possible sighting of the 752, at a hotel where a black market seller is holding supernatural items. Guy chooses to go along on the mission, with Jasper granting him access to one of his revenants Checkers, revealed to vampire experiments he has made, for protection. At the hotel, Guy runs into Doris and he tries to get her to leave to prevent her getting in danger, to no avail. Guy meets Talamasca agent Raglan James who seems to be operating on his own assignment and quickly discerns Guy’s reasons for coming but chooses to work with him for the time being. Guy and Raglan meet with the black market dealer with things going smoothly for a while until their real involvement gets discovered. The dealer begins brutally torturing Raglan and upon learning Guy’s powers, forces Guy to use his powers to recreate a childhood memory. Checkers is released and brutally kills the black market dealer and his men, leaving Raglan, Guy and Doris as the sole survivors. The group finds that the 752 isn’t there, only the dried out vampire, with Raglan leaving and stealing a sample of the blood, his own personal interest all along. Guy throws his pills away as Doris departs. Jasper arrives and is dismayed at the state of the dried out vampire, choosing to mercy kill him rather than have him suffer longer, venting his frustration against those like the Talamasca who he believes only bring more harm like this. Jasper and Guy depart and Doris is revealed to have snuck into the back of the waiting van.
5	"The Puzzle Palace"	Louise Hooper	Mark Lafferty & Vinnie Wilhelm	November 16, 2025	0.190
Guy finds Doris and gets her to leave before Jasper finds her, but at the cost of Jasper finding Guy’s betrayal. Jasper savagely turns against Guy and makes him dig his own grave, at threat of the revenants killing him. Doris returns and rescues Guy, setting Jasper’s face ablaze along the way, as they escape into the city. While Jasper recovers from his attack, Guy make contact with Helen, finally annulling his commitment to the Talamasca in favor of instead getting sanctuary away from London, which Helen reluctantly agrees to. Guy and Doris begin developing a romantic connection, as it is revealed that she is seemingly secretly holding the 752 book. Wanting to keep them in London, Jasper sets the next part of his plan in motion, wiping out Kevis’ coven aboard a ship through explosives set by his secret protege: Olive.
6	"The 752"	Louise Hooper	Mark Lafferty & Vinnie Wilhelm	November 23, 2025	N/A
Finding the wreckage, Guy and Doris are both taken for interrogation by the police. Olive, using a disguise, manages to free them but not before her true identity is discovered by the police and Guy and Doris are forced into a confrontation with her. Doris is revealed as a vampire during the fight, with Guy finding the book. He quickly discovers that the book is just a scrapbook, with photographs of her and Kevis. Doris reveals her secret at the same time as Helen discovers information about her sister from Talamasca Doctor Arthur Jameson. It turns out that Doris is actually Emma Steven--Helen’s sister--originally a witch but having turned herself into a vampire in her 30s. At the same time, Doris consumed the knowledge from the 752 into herself, using her witch powers. Thus the knowledge from the 752 is in Doris, and not in any physical book. Eventually, Doris became a parental figure to Kevis. Doctor Jameson is killed as it is revealed that the main Talamasca sector is wishing to go after everyone involved in these events, while the police hunt after them as well, concerning connections to crime scenes. Helen manages to get Guy and Doris out of the city but not before being arrested herself. On Helen’s way to prison, Officer Ridge asks Helen what’s really going on (something almost every character is wondering). Meanwhile, Greg Owen turns against Jasper, and Jasper kills him. The London Motherhouse is then raided by Talamasca operatives who take out most of Jasper's revenants, knock him out and have a muzzle placed on him to negate his power. Olive returns to the desolate Motherhouse and finds Checkers, who she is able to gain control of. The Houseman--leader of the main Talamasca Headquarters--makes a deal with Jasper for his eventual freedom: Jasper agrees to create an army’s worth of revenants for the Talamasca. On a ship, Guy and Doris travel out in search of finding Guy’s mother.

== Production ==
=== Development ===
In June 2024, it was reported that AMC had ordered a six-episode season of The Talamasca. The series is created by John Lee Hancock who also is co-showrunner and executive produces the series alongside Mark Lafferty. By April 2025, the title had been modified to The Talamasca: The Secret Order. On March 27, 2026, AMC canceled the series after one season.

=== Casting ===
In September 2024, it was announced that Nicholas Denton would portray Guy Anatole in the series. Later that month, it was announced that William Fichtner would portray Jasper and that Elizabeth McGovern would portray Helen. In November 2024, it was announced that Maisie Richardson-Sellers had joined the cast as Olive. In May 2025, AMC announced Céline Buckens in the contract role of Doris and Jason Schwartzman guest starring as the "rakish vampire" Burton.

=== Filming ===
Principal photography for the first season was announced begin in the fall of 2024 in Manchester, England. By October 2024, production had begun.

=== Future ===
In interviews after the cancellation of the show, Rolin Jones, the showrunner of the first three seasons of Interview with the Vampire, expressed how he enjoyed the cast and elements from the show, and teased the potential to incorporate elements from Talamasca into the "cataclysmic global" events of the fourth season, which was set to adapt The Queen of the Damned.

== Release ==
Talamasca: The Secret Order premiered on AMC on October 19, 2025, with a sneak peek airing of the series premiere episode prior to the official October 26, 2025, premiere.

On August 23, 2026, all six episodes of Talamasca: The Secret Order were released on Netflix through a licensing arrangement with AMC.

== Reception ==
=== Critical response ===
On the review aggregator website Rotten Tomatoes, the series holds an approval rating of 64% based on 22 critic reviews. The website's critics consensus reads, "Talamasca: The Secret Order indulges in the world of Anne Rice's Immortal Universe, though lacking compared to other supernatural procedurals, its endless potential far outweighs its completionist fare." Metacritic gave the series a weighted average score of 63 out of 100 based on 15 critics, indicating "generally favorable".

=== Ratings ===
Viewership and ratings per episode of Talamasca: The Secret Order
No.	Title	Air date	Rating (18–49)	Viewers (millions)	Ref.
2	"A Wilderness of Mirrors"	October 29, 2025	0.02	0.172	
3	"The Task at Hand"	November 2, 2025	0.02	0.211	
5	"The Puzzle Palace"	November 16, 2025	0.02	0.190	

=== Accolades ===
Awards and nominations received by Talamasca: The Secret Order
Award	Year (Note: The listed year refers to the date of the ceremony.)	Category	Nominee(s)	Result	Ref.
Saturn Awards	2026	Best Horror Television Series	Talamasca: The Secret Order	Nominated	
Saturn Awards	2026	Best Supporting Actor in a Television Series	William Fichtner	Nominated	
