= Sang et Or =

Sang et Or means Blood and Gold in French.

Sang et Or may refer to:

== Sports ==
- Sang et Or, a nickname for the French football club ESA Linas-Montlhéry
- Sang et Or, a nickname for the French football club RC Lens
- Les Sang et Or, a nickname for the French football club Le Mans FC
- Les Sang et Or, a nickname for the Belgian football club A.F.C. Tubize
- Les Sangs et Ors, a nickname for the French football club Calais RUFC

== See also ==
- Blood and Gold, a horror novel written by Anne Rice
