= Blood and Gold =

2001 novel by Anne Rice

- First edition
- Author: Anne Rice
- Cover artist: Detail of Mars from Sandro Botticelli's Mars and Venus (c. 1483)
- Language: English
- Series: The Vampire Chronicles
- Genre: Horror
- Published: October 16, 2001
- Publisher: Knopf
- Publication place: United States
- Media type: Print (Hardcover)
- Pages: 480
- ISBN: 0-679-45449-7
- OCLC: 46935938
- Dewey Decimal: 813/.54 21
- LC Class: PS3568.I265 B58 2001
- Preceded by: Merrick
- Followed by: Blackwood Farm

Blood and Gold (2001) is a vampire novel by American writer Anne Rice, the eighth book in her Vampire Chronicles series.

== Plot summary ==
The book begins with an ancient vampire of Nordic descent awaking after being frozen in a block of ice for hundreds of years. The vampire, Thorne, meets Marius de Romanus and inquires about Marius' past. Marius then provides his life story.

As a young Roman patrician, Marius was abducted by druids who were trying to find a replacement for their "god of the grove"—a vampire, kept locked inside a chamber underneath a tree, who took on the role of a god in a druidic religion. Marius does not want to receive the powers of the dying god, but is given them nonetheless.

Unable to face a life imprisoned in a tree, Marius escapes from the druids (one of whom is Mael). He embarks on a trip to Egypt, where he learns of Akasha and Enkil, the Mother and Father or Those Who Must Be Kept—the progenitors of all vampire-kind. He takes them back to Rome with him after learning that if they die then every other vampire in the world will suffer the same fate.

He falls in love with a mortal woman, Pandora, and turns her into a vampire. They live together happily for a long time, although they argue frequently. One day, their house is attacked by a group of vampires who want to know the secrets of Those Who Must Be Kept. Though they destroy these vampires, the attack leads to an argument between the two, and Marius, filled with anger, leaves Pandora.

Marius then returns to Rome, where he creates a life for himself as a socialite, fraternizing with mortals and practicing painting. It is here that he meets Mael and Avicus, the latter of which is a former god of the grove—a vampire older than Marius, but who does not seem to know his own power. There is still much enmity between Mael and Marius, and Marius asks them to leave. They do so, but remain in the city of Rome. Marius does not mind this, as they keep the city free from other blood-drinkers who may pry the secrets of Those Who Must Be Kept from his mind. Marius continues to live this way even as the Roman Empire splits, with its capital city moving to Constantinople.

Eventually, Marius, Mael, and Avicus leave Rome when it is sacked by barbarians. They travel to Constantinople, taking with them the Mother and Father. There they meet a powerful vampire named Eudoxia, who wants Marius to put Those Who Must Be Kept into her care. After praying to Those Who Must Be Kept for an answer, he relents just far enough to allow Eudoxia to see them. After a series of violent conflicts, Marius angrily drags Eudoxia back down into the shrine and casts her at Akasha, who suddenly awakens to destroy her.

Realizing that he cannot live with other vampires due to his custody of the Divine Parents, Marius elects to return to Italy. He becomes disheartened by the horrors of the Black Death and sleeps for hundreds of years. He awakes again during the Renaissance and travels all around Italy, visiting Venice and Florence, admiring the art and culture. In Rome he meets the vampire Santino, who claims that Marius is living in sin by not serving Satan. Marius threatens him and tells Santino to never come near him again.

Marius decides to make his home in Venice, and he establishes himself as an amateur painter. His house is set up as a place where young boys can come and improve themselves, preparing to go to university or to become craftsmen. During this time, he also falls in love with the works of Botticelli, whom he briefly considers turning into a vampire.

It is in Venice that Marius meets Amadeo (Armand), whom he discovers in a filthy cellar, waiting to become a prostitute in the city's brothels. He purchases the boy from the slave traders and takes him back to his house, where he bathes him and promises him a better life.

As the years pass, Marius happily continues his life, disappearing occasionally to attend to the Divine Parents. Amadeo grows up, and the two often share a bed. Marius is sorely tempted to give Amadeo the Dark Gift, making him into a vampire, but he stops himself from doing so.

When Marius is away looking after the Divine Parents, his house is attacked by the Englishman Lord Harlech who became obsessed with Amadeo after sleeping with him. Amadeo manages to kill Harlech, but sustains several wounds from Harlech's poisoned blade. He slips into a fever. Marius arrives and is told that Amadeo will die as the poison is too strong. Marius turns Amadeo into a vampire in order to prevent the boy from dying. He teaches him to prey only on evildoers in order to save his conscience.

Some time after Amadeo becomes a vampire, the house is attacked by a large mob of Satan-worshiping vampires under the leadership of Santino. Marius is burnt and almost killed, but manages to save his own life by jumping into a canal. Nonetheless, he is severely wounded and believes that Amadeo will be killed.

He calls a woman named Bianca to his aid. The two have known each other for a number of years and have a close relationship. Marius is too weak to hunt, so he transforms Bianca into a vampire in order to have her help him to recover his strength. The two move to the shrine of Those Who Must Be Kept and live there for over a century, where Marius gradually recovers his strength by drinking from Akasha.

After Amadeo had transformed, Marius had met with Raymond Gallant, a man from the Talamasca, a group of scholars who found out information about supernatural things, just for information. He hears from him that Pandora is being kept hostage by another vampire and moved around Europe and Russia; so Marius decides to move to Dresden to try meeting with Pandora, whom he still loves. He does not tell Bianca of this. Marius does indeed find Pandora there, but discovers that she does not want to live with him and Bianca and wants to stay with her traveling companion, who was not holding her hostage after all. Marius offers to leave Bianca for Pandora, but Pandora refuses this offer. When Marius sees Bianca the next day, she declares that she is leaving him because she overheard what he said to Pandora. 50 years later, as he is shifting to America, Marius discovers a letter from Pandora offering to live with him if he comes to collect her at a certain place, but it is too late and she is gone.

Marius then shelters a young vampire named Lestat de Lioncourt, who wakes up Akasha when playing a song for her on his violin. She comes to him and they drink each other's blood. Enkil is furious and almost crushes Lestat when a shocked Marius saves him. Marius sends Lestat away, thinking that he can pose a danger, but is sad that it is the fourth time he is losing a love. Years later, Marius brings a television into Those Who Must Be Kept's Chapel, for their entertainment. On this they see news, songs, as well as The Vampire Lestat's rock guitar music. This, Marius feels, corrupts their minds, and Akasha awakens from her slumber with the evil idea of taking over the world. She destroys Enkil and buries Marius in the ruins of his house, where he lies, injured.

Marius lies there trapped, for weeks, but with the Mind Gift informs Lestat that he is in danger, and also asks for help. He is soon found by Pandora, and Santino—whom he tries to kill, but realizes that all force would be needed to stop Akasha from her evil deed of taking over the world, killing all men and having a female-dominated world with her as the leader. A council is formed and the vampires try to convince Akasha, but she does not listen. Finally, Maharet's (who created Thorne) mute twin sister, Mekare, fights with Akasha and destroys her. That is the end of Marius's story through time.

The story then moves back to the present day, where Marius and Thorne are at a jungle hideaway with other old and powerful vampires—Amadeo (now going by the name Armand), Santino, Maharet, Mekare, and Pandora. Marius wants justice against Santino for taking Armand away from him, but Maharet refuses to let Marius kill Santino, who is weak. Thorne does not want to accept her decision and so kills Santino himself with the Fire Gift. In penance for his deed, he gives his eyes to Maharet.

== Reception ==
Kirkus writes in a star review "given her historical antecedents, Rice-Who-Must-Be-Obeyed writes like a damned Queen. Pure vellum in the chronicle." Publishers Weekly called the book "intriguing yet rushed".
