= Merrick (novel) =

2000 novel by Anne Rice

- First edition
- Author: Anne Rice
- Audio read by: Graeme Malcolm
- Cover artist: Henri Rousseau; The Snake Charmer (1907)
- Language: English
- Series: The Vampire Chronicles
- Genre: Horror fiction
- Published: October 17, 2000
- Publisher: Knopf
- Publication place: United States
- Media type: Print (Hardcover, Paperback) and audio book
- Pages: 307
- ISBN: 0-679-45448-9
- OCLC: 43115157
- Dewey Decimal: 813/.54 21
- LC Class: PS3568.I265 M48 2000
- Preceded by: The Vampire Armand
- Followed by: Blood and Gold

Merrick is a 2000 vampire novel by American writer Anne Rice, the seventh book in her The Vampire Chronicles series. The novel includes some characters who cross over from Rice's Lives of the Mayfair Witches trilogy (1990–1994). Elements of the novel were incorporated in the episode "Montreal" of The Vampire Lestat.

== Plot summary ==
Louis de Pointe du Lac is being haunted by the spirit of Claudia, his adopted daughter, a child who, like Louis, had been turned into a vampire by Lestat de Lioncourt but was destroyed long ago. With the help of former Talamasca leader-turned-vampire David Talbot, Louis asks the beautiful witch Merrick Mayfair to use her spiritual powers to contact Claudia's ghost.

Merrick is also a former agent of the Talamasca, and shared many adventures with David in the past. Flashbacks introduce Merrick's malevolent sister, Honey Isabella or Honey in the Sunshine; Merrick's mother, Cold Sandra; and the Great Nananne, a powerful witch whose very presence is enough to frighten and instill respect in David. Merrick and David recall their journey to a cave in Central America which contained malevolent spirits protecting an ancient jade mask, which allows people to see spirits as if they were corporeal.

Merrick retrieves Claudia's diary from the Talamasca vaults, and makes it possible for Louis to speak with Claudia. The spirit's harsh words confirm the negative feelings for Louis that Claudia expressed in her diary, and a despairing Louis attempts suicide by exposing himself to the sun. Made a vampire by Lestat, Louis is too powerful to be destroyed in this manner, and his burned body is restored with vampiric blood bestowed by Lestat, David, and new vampire Merrick. She reveals that from the beginning, she used her magic to lure David and Louis to her in hopes of receiving the Dark Gift of vampirism. The turning of Merrick into a vampire infuriates the Talamasca, but in a letter David advises that they not wage war against the vampires because Lestat is too formidable a foe.

== Crossovers ==
Some characters from Rice's Lives of the Mayfair Witches trilogy (1990–1994) appear in Merrick, and later Blackwood Farm (2002) and Blood Canticle (2003).

== Audiobooks ==
In 2000, Penguin Random House Audio released an abridged audiobook adaptation of Merrick, narrated by Derek Jacobi, as well as an unabridged version, narrated by Graeme Malcolm.

== Critical reception ==
Merrick debuted at No. 2 on The New York Times Best Seller list, and remained in that position for two weeks, spending a total of 10 weeks on the list. Publishers Weekly wrote, "This volume merges several long-running plots; the first chapters sag with the weight of their exposition, and the prose seems overheated even for Rice ... Displaying her imaginative talents for atmosphere and suspense, Rice creates a riveting scene that shows Merrick's awesome magic at work."
