= Hard Time Romance =

- Theatrical release poster
- Directed by: John Lee Hancock
- Written by: John Lee Hancock
- Starring: Leon Rippy; Tom Everett; Mariska Hargitay; Robert Z'Dar; Bill Allen; James Eric; Tom Kurlander; Peter Sherayko; William Smith
- Cinematography: Stephen Sheridan
- Edited by: Kurt Bullinger; Michael Schulte
- Music by: Christopher Lindsey
- Distributed by: Falcon Arts & Entertainment
- Release date: 1991
- Running time: 90 minutes
- Country: United States
- Language: English

Hard Time Romance or Vaya con Dios is a 1991 American romantic comedy film written and directed by John Lee Hancock. It was Hancock's directorial debut film.

The film stars Leon Rippy, Tom Everett and Mariska Hargitay.

== Plot ==
A second-rate rodeo cowboy jumps through numerous hoops with the ultimate goal of marrying his beloved girlfriend.

== Cast ==
- Leon Rippy as Hugh Dean Simpson
- Tom Everett as Elroy Swain
- Mariska Hargitay as Anita
- Robert Z'Dar as Ted
- Bill Allen as Justin
- James Eric as The Professor
- Tom Kurlander as Gas Station Attendant
- Peter Sherayko as Crimson Joe
- William Smith as Stinky Palmer
- Tony Escobar as Disco Cellmate
- Carol Neisingh as Betty Palmer
- Dylan Ogden as Huey Palmer Junior
- Salvador P. Gomez, Jr., as Lopez
- Raymundo Quinonez, Jr. as Jorge
- Roy Nigra as Prison Guard
- Ted Scanlon as Singer
- Adan Saenz as Old Mexican
- George Davbis as Bill Simpson
