= John Lee Hancock =

American filmmaker (born 1956)

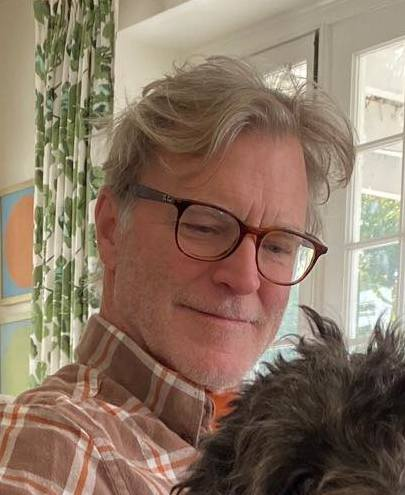
- Hancock in 2021
- Born: December 15, 1956 (age 69); Longview, Texas, U.S.
- Education: Baylor University (BA, JD)
- Occupations: Screenwriter; director; producer
- Years active: 1987–present

John Lee Hancock Jr. (born December 15, 1956) is an American filmmaker. He is best known for directing the films The Rookie (2002), The Alamo (2004), The Blind Side (2009), Saving Mr. Banks (2013), The Founder (2016), The Highwaymen (2019), The Little Things (2021), and Mr. Harrigan's Phone (2022). He also wrote the screenplay for the film A Perfect World (1993).

== Early life and education ==
Hancock was born in Longview, but grew up in Texas City. His father, John Lee Hancock Sr., played football for Baylor and in the NFL and went on to become a football coach at Texas City High School. His mother, Sue Hancock is a retired English teacher who taught in the Texas City ISD. The eldest of four children (two brothers and one sister), John Jr. played football and competed in swimming while in high school (his brother played briefly in the NFL). Throughout high school and when home from college, John worked in his grandfather's pipe fabrication shop, located near the industrial refineries of his hometown, Texas City, Texas. Hancock received his bachelor's degree in English from Baylor in 1979 and earned a J.D. degree from Baylor Law School in 1982.

== Career ==
After working in a Houston law firm for four years, he decided to pursue screenwriting and moved to Los Angeles. Choosing not to take the California bar exam and practice law in California, Hancock instead held numerous non-legal jobs those next few years, took acting classes, and worked in local theater. He debuted as both a screenwriter and director with 1991's Hard Time Romance, and another screenplay he wrote in 1991 was noticed by Clint Eastwood and went on to become A Perfect World directed by Eastwood and starring Eastwood and Kevin Costner. He went on to produce the critically acclaimed My Dog Skip before finding widespread recognition as director of The Rookie, which won an ESPY in 2002 for "Best Sports Movie" and was both critically and commercially successful. He also wrote the screenplay for Midnight in the Garden of Good and Evil and directed The Alamo, a remake of the 1960 film. It starred Dennis Quaid, Billy Bob Thornton, Jason Patric and Patrick Wilson.

After a five-year absence from directing spent honing his screenwriting skills, Hancock returned to both his football and Christian roots with 2009's The Blind Side, a biographical sports drama film starring Quinton Aaron as Michael Oher, a homeless, 350-pound African-American teenager who ended up becoming the Baltimore Ravens' first-round pick in the 2009 NFL draft, and Sandra Bullock as Leigh Anne Tuohy, a well-off Memphis woman who makes room in her life for Oher. With a budget of $29 million, the film grossed over $309 million, becoming Hancock's highest-grossing film to date, and received two Academy Award nominations for Best Picture and Best Actress, with Bullock winning the latter award. Bullock also won Screen Actors Guild and Golden Globe awards for her portrayal of Tuohy.

In 2013 Hancock directed Saving Mr. Banks, a film about the life of P. L. Travers and her difficult negotiations with Walt Disney over adapting her novel Mary Poppins into a feature film. He also directed The Founder (2016), about the McDonald's fast food chain, and co-wrote the upcoming musical film The Goree Girls. In 2019 he directed his first Netflix movie The Highwaymen.

Hancock also directed the pilot of the television series Paradise Lost, which premiered on April 13, 2020.

In 2021, he wrote, directed The Little Things. He also served as producer alongside Mark Johnson. The plot follows two police officers (Denzel Washington and Rami Malek) who try to catch a serial killer in 1990s Los Angeles; the film also stars Jared Leto as their top suspect and Natalie Morales as another detective.

In 2022, he wrote and directed Mr. Harrigan's Phone. Based on a short story by Stephen King, which appears in the collection If It Bleeds, the film follows a boy who befriends an older billionaire who lives in his small town. When the man dies, the boy finds himself able to communicate with his friend from the grave by leaving voicemails on the iPhone that was buried with him.

In 2025, Hancock created the television series Talamasca: The Secret Order, for AMC which premiered on October 26, 2025. The series is based on The Vampire Chronicles and Lives of the Mayfair Witches by Anne Rice.

== Filmography ==
=== Films ===
Year	Title	Director	Writer	Producer
1991	Hard Time Romance	Yes	Yes	No
1993	A Perfect World	No	Yes	No
1997	Midnight in the Garden of Good and Evil	No	Yes	No
2000	My Dog Skip	No	No	Yes
2002	The Rookie	Yes	No	No
2004	The Alamo	Yes	Yes	No
2009	The Blind Side	Yes	Yes	No
2012	Snow White and the Huntsman	No	Yes	No
2013	Saving Mr. Banks	Yes	No	No
2016	The Founder	Yes	No	No
2019	The Highwaymen	Yes	No	Executive
2021	The Little Things	Yes	Yes	Yes
2022	Mr. Harrigan's Phone	Yes	Yes	No
2027	Monsanto	Yes	Yes	No

Uncredited writing roles

- Spy Game (2001)
- Bad Boys II (2003)
- King Arthur (2004)
- G.I. Joe: The Rise of Cobra (2009)
- Safe House (2012)
- Maleficent (2014)
- The Magnificent Seven (2016)
- Chaos Walking (2021)
- Infinite (2021)
- Havoc (2025)

=== Television ===
Year	Title	Creator	Writer	Director	Executive Producer	Notes
1998–1999	L.A. Doctors	Yes	Yes	Yes	Yes	Directed episode "Where the Rubber Meets the Road"
2000	Falcone	No	Yes	Yes	Yes	Directed episode "Pilot"
2020	Paradise Lost	No	No	Yes	No	Episode "Down the Rabbit Hole"
2025	Talamasca: The Secret Order	Yes	Yes	Yes	Yes	Directed episodes "We Watch. And We Are Always There." and "A Wilderness of Mirrors"
