= The Tale of the Body Thief =

1992 novel by Anne Rice

- First edition
- Author: Anne Rice
- Cover artist: Chip Kidd (designer); The Rape of the Sabine Women (1574–1582) by Giambologna
- Language: English
- Series: The Vampire Chronicles
- Genre: Gothic, Horror
- Published: October 4, 1992
- Publisher: Knopf
- Publication place: United States
- Media type: Print (Hardcover, Paperback) & audio book
- Pages: 448 (hardcover & paperback edition)
- ISBN: 978-0-679-40528-3 (hardcover edition)
- OCLC: 26703895
- Dewey Decimal: 813/.54 20
- LC Class: PS3568.I265 T34 1992
- Preceded by: The Queen of the Damned
- Followed by: Memnoch the Devil

The Tale of the Body Thief is a vampire novel by American writer Anne Rice, the fourth in her The Vampire Chronicles series, following The Queen of the Damned (1988). Published in 1992, it continues the adventures of Lestat, specifically his efforts to regain his lost humanity during the late 20th century. Chapters from the book appeared in the October 1992 issue of Playboy.

== Plot summary ==
At the beginning of the story, Lestat grows depressed and becomes remorseful because of his vampiric nature. Although he tries to limit his victims to murderers, serial killers and other criminals, he nonetheless caves into temptation once in a while and kills an "innocent", or someone who he feels does not necessarily deserve to die. Lestat also suffers from constant nightmares concerning his late "daughter", Claudia, for whose death he blames himself.

Since Akasha's defeat, Lestat has become extremely lonely. Among his only remaining friends is David Talbot, the elderly mortal head of the Talamasca. Although Lestat has repeatedly offered to turn David, he has always refused to become a vampire and keep Lestat company through eternity. Lestat goes to the Gobi Desert at dawn in a half-hearted suicide attempt. When he does not die, he goes to David's home in England to heal.

A mysterious figure, Raglan James, approaches Lestat with what seems to be a cure for his ennui and depression. James sends Lestat several messages hinting that he has the ability to switch bodies. Eventually, he proposes to Lestat that the two of them trade bodies for a day. David reveals that James was a gifted psychic who once joined the Talamasca, but was kicked out of the order for constant theft.

James is a kleptomaniac who has stolen or schemed for literally everything he owns, from his house to his body. However, he also has major psychic problems, and his life is a series of cycles—he gets rich by theft, then often ends up in prison. Dying of cancer several years before, James tricked an inmate of a mental institution into switching bodies with him, allowing him a type of immortality. Against the advice of David and other vampires, Lestat jumps at the opportunity. Unfortunately, James has no intention of ever switching back, and Lestat is forced to scheme to regain his body.

Lestat nearly dies after becoming human again—his new body is wracked by pneumonia, which he ignores during a tour of Washington D.C. in the middle of winter. He is saved by the care of a nun named Gretchen. He enjoys a short love affair with Gretchen before she returns to South America, where she works in a convent, and Lestat sets out in search of his body.

Lestat seeks help from other vampires but is completely ostracized. Louis turns Lestat away when he asks to turn his new body, arguing that Lestat ought to be happy to be human again and also calling him out for slandering him in previous writings. Marius is extremely angry at him for leaving such a powerful body to a thief. Lestat's only ally is David.

It is James's lack of imagination and petty thievery that allow Lestat and David to track him down. Despite his newfound wealth and powerful new body, James continues to steal jewelry from people. He also makes a conspicuous show of his wealth, boarding the Queen Elizabeth 2 and draining victims of their blood along the ship's path. The pattern allows his pursuers to easily find him aboard the ship. While Lestat manages to regain his body with David's help, he performs the switch during a sunrise and must immediately flee to a safe place during the day. When he awakes in the evening, he finds that both David and James have disappeared.

Lestat finds David in Florida and is surprised to find that his friend, despite his earlier protestations, now wants to become a vampire. However, while taking his blood, Lestat discovers a final trick—when forced out of Lestat's body, James took over David's body instead of returning to his own. Lestat angrily attacks James, crushing his skull. The blow proves fatal—the injury damages James's brain and prevents him from either leaving the dying body or attempting another switch.

David begins to enjoy life in the young body previously occupied by James. Lestat returns to New Orleans, reunites with Louis, and begins to renovate his old house in the French Quarter. However, Lestat regains his "evil" nature upon finally accepting his vampirism and decides to turn David against his wishes. David initially resists Lestat's aggressive advances, but eventually succumbs. Soon after David and Lestat admit their love for each other. David disappears again, prompting Lestat to fruitlessly search for him. Lestat returns to New Orleans and is surprised to find that David has already contacted Louis.

David explains to Lestat that, in secret, this is what he always truly wanted. He tells Lestat that he is no longer angry with him, although he does usurp Lestat's position of leadership, despite the latter's protests. Having gotten rid of his old age and mortality, David plans to visit Rio de Janeiro with Louis, and asks Lestat to join him. At the end, Lestat realizes that, despite all that happened, he is still alone, has failed to regain his "humanity", and has thrown away his only chance to make amends for his past misdeeds.

== Adaptations ==
In 2007, The Tale of the Body Thief was rumored to be adapted into film as United Artists was interested in purchasing the film rights to the novel. Rice announced via her Facebook profile on February 7, 2012, that Brian Grazer and Ron Howard's film production company, Imagine Entertainment, had optioned the motion picture rights to the novel. Lee Patterson was to have written the screenplay. Transformer's Alex Kurtzman and Roberto Orci were also said to be on board as producers during the time of development.

"The plan is to treat the character (Lestat) as if audiences have not met him before," said Entertainment Weekly with word from Imagine.

On April 7, 2013, during a live-internet radio chat with her son Christopher and co-host Eric Shaw Quinn, Anne explained that a film adaptation is no longer in development and stated on her Facebook profile: "No Lestat movie in the works—after all these years, and the best efforts of all involved... We've encountered difficulties we cannot at this time overcome." Rice's son Christopher apparently drafted and adapted a screenplay from the novel that was met with praise from those involved; however, the project has been dismissed as the studio isn't "willing to move forward with it" due to differences that were beyond them.

As of August 2014, an entire reboot of The Vampire Chronicles was planned by producers Alex Kurtzman and Roberto Orci after the motion picture rights were optioned by Universal Pictures and Imagine Entertainment. Christopher Rice's screenplay for The Tale of the Body Thief was reportedly worked into the recent deal for a proposed film franchise and a reinterpretation of Interview with the Vampire was also hinted by Rice herself via Facebook. However, in November 2016 Universal did not renew the contract, and the film and television rights reverted to Rice, who began developing The Vampire Chronicles into a television series with Christopher.

The character Raglan James is portrayed in a recurring role within AMC’s Interview with the Vampire, starting in the second season, and the spin-off series Talamasca: The Secret Order. He is depicted as currently still operating as a shady, freelance Talamasca agent who involves himself in the lives of Louis, Lestat, and Daniel Molloy for his own dubious reasons.

== Reception ==
The New York Times remarked that the "gorgeousness" found in the prose of earlier novels is "practically absent from "Body Thief" and noted that "The "Vampire Chronicles" seem to be careening down a steep, sad slope". Kirkus Reviews said the novel starts slow, but once it gets going, Rice "provides her most inspired pages ever". Publishers Weekly called the prose "sensuous" and "fluid".
