= Blackwood Farm =

2002 novel by Anne Rice

- First edition cover
- Author: Anne Rice
- Audio read by: David Pittu
- Language: English
- Series: The Vampire Chronicles; The Mayfair Witches
- Subject: Vampires, Witches
- Genre: Suspense, Romance, horror
- Published: October 29, 2002
- Publisher: Knopf
- Publication place: United States
- Media type: Print
- Pages: 544
- ISBN: 0-345-44368-3
- Preceded by: Blood and Gold, Taltos
- Followed by: Blood Canticle

Blackwood Farm is a 2002 vampire novel by American writer Anne Rice, the ninth book in her The Vampire Chronicles series. The novel includes some characters who cross over from Rice's Lives of the Mayfair Witches trilogy (1990–1994), continuing the unified story begun in Merrick (2000).

== Plot summary ==
Tarquin "Quinn" Blackwood, heir to a powerful old family in New Orleans, has been plagued by a mysterious spirit named Goblin for his entire life. Made a vampire in his youth, Quinn seeks out Lestat de Lioncourt looking for help in getting rid of Goblin, who has become more and more malevolent. Quinn recalls his youth, his family, and his forced transformation into a vampire by Petronia. His stories allow Lestat to better understand the reach and power of Goblin, and clue in Lestat to the fact that Quinn is connected to the Mayfair family of witches. After his own failure defeating Goblin, Lestat asks the witch Merrick Mayfair, also a vampire, for assistance. Meanwhile, Quinn has fallen in love with heiress Mona Mayfair, and the ghost of their mutual ancestor Julien Mayfair warns him against making Mona a vampire. Goblin is revealed to be the spirit of Quinn's twin Gawain, who died days after being born. He is bound to Quinn, and is relentlessly jealous to experience whatever Quinn does. Merrick performs a ritual using Gawain's corpse to exorcise Goblin. She sacrifices herself by carrying the child's spirit into the hereafter with her, and Lestat is heartbroken.

== Crossovers ==
Some characters from Rice's Lives of the Mayfair Witches trilogy (1990–1994) appear in Merrick (2000), and later Blackwood Farm and Blood Canticle (2003).

== Audiobooks ==
In 2002, Penguin Random House Audio released an abridged audiobook adaptation of Blackwood Farm, narrated by Stephen Spinella, as well as an unabridged version, narrated by David Pittu.

== Critical reception ==
Blackwood Farm debuted at No. 4 on The New York Times Best Seller list, spending a total of five weeks on the list. Publishers Weekly wrote that the novel contains plenty of "intrigue, eroticism and obsession", adding that "Rice fleshes out her slim plot line with gory set pieces of vampire history in ancient Athens, Pompeii and 19th century Naples. She excels at vivid descriptions of macabre landscapes, gloomy estate houses and the lust that motivates her Blood Hunters and propels her ghoulish narratives. Her dialogue and characterizations, however—even of the durable Vampire Lestat—are flat and predictable here." Reviewing the audiobook adaptation, AudioFile wrote, "Fraught with swamps, witches, cemeteries, forbidden love, and blood lust, all knotted up with family honor, this steamy potboiler is perfect for the 'vampirophile.'"
