= The Vampire Armand =

1998 novel by Anne Rice

- First edition
- Author: Anne Rice
- Cover artist: Detail of Mercury from Sandro Botticelli's Primavera (1482)
- Language: English
- Series: The Vampire Chronicles
- Genre: Gothic fiction, erotica
- Published: October 10, 1998
- Publisher: Knopf
- Publication place: United States
- Media type: Print (Hardcover, Paperback) & audio book
- Pages: 387 (hardcover edition) & 400pp/520 pp (paperback edition)
- ISBN: 978-0-679-45447-2
- OCLC: 38521516
- Dewey Decimal: 813/.54 21
- LC Class: PS3568.I265 V25 1998
- Preceded by: Memnoch the Devil
- Followed by: Merrick

The Vampire Armand (1998) is a vampire novel by American writer Anne Rice, the sixth in her The Vampire Chronicles series.

== Plot summary ==
With Lestat de Lioncourt still in slumber since Memnoch the Devil, the vampire coven is reunited around the "brat prince" and the vampire David Talbot asks Armand to tell his life story.

Born somewhere in the Kyivan Rus in the late 15th century, Armand (at this time called Andrei) becomes an icon painter in a monastery. He is forcefully taken out of this life of prayer and devotion by slave traders, who transport him to Constantinople and then to a brothel in Venice. Soon after his arrival, he is purchased by the vampire Marius de Romanus, who names him Amadeo.

Marius lives the extravagant life of a respected Renaissance painter, and mentors many boys who serve as his apprentices. Marius provides them with education, shelter, and food, and he assists them in finding respectable positions once they are grown. Over time, Amadeo's relationship with Marius develops and they become much closer than Marius is with any of the other boys. In addition to developing a sexual relationship, Amadeo sleeps in Marius' bed, is privy to special privileges, and becomes something of a "head boy" in the household. Still, Marius maintains strict control over Amadeo, and expects industriousness from him in all things.

When Amadeo comes of age, Marius begins Amadeo's education in sexuality and coupling. He takes Amadeo to a brothel, where he remains for several days. Amadeo later visits a male brothel, and makes several observations about the difference in sexual activities with the different genders. There is a distinct bisexuality to Amadeo's nature, as he enjoys activity with either sex. He later has a brief affair with an Englishman called Lord Harlech, who develops an unrequited obsession with Amadeo. During this period, Amadeo befriends and ultimately seduces Bianca Solderini, a wealthy debutante and courtesan whose primary role in life seems to be to throw nightly parties.

Marius eventually divulges his vampire nature to Amadeo, who almost immediately begins asking to be turned. Marius shows Amadeo some of what it means to be immortal, and allows him to join him in the hunt on several occasions. He tells Amadeo that they must always focus on killing evildoers; they assist Bianca by murdering her kinsmen who have been forcing her to poison those from whom they have borrowed money.

Eventually, on a night when Marius is out of the country, Harlech breaks into Marius's palazzo and attacks Amadeo, murdering two apprentices in the process. Amadeo kills Harlech, but not before the Englishman wounds him with a poisoned sword. Amadeo falls critically ill, and over several days falls into fever and delusions. Upon returning and finding Amadeo on his deathbed, Marius heals Amadeo's external wounds, cleans and grooms him, then gives him the Dark Gift, turning him into a vampire.

Marius sets out to train Amadeo, retaining high expectations of him, and forces him to continue his education in the arts. Amadeo's transition to vampire is relatively easy for him, although the Dark Gift brings about nightmares of his childhood. Marius and Amadeo return to Ukraine, where Amadeo visits his old school and home. He finds his elderly parents, reveals that he is alive, and leaves them with all the money and jewels he has with him.

Shortly after returning to Venice, the vampire Santino and his coven attack Marius' home, kidnap Amadeo and the apprentices, and burn the villa. Marius is burned and thought to be destroyed; his boys are taken to a bonfire and thrown in one by one by the coven as Amadeo watches. Santino spares Amadeo and educates him in the laws of the coven. Amadeo later goes to Paris, changes his name to Armand, and creates his own coven under the Cimetière des Innocents, which Lestat would years later drastically impact, thus resulting in the creation of the Théâtre des Vampires.

In the final segment of the book, Armand explains what occurred to him after the final chapters of Memnoch the Devil. At the end of Memnoch the Devil, Armand rushes into the open daylight and appears to be destroyed in a conflagration. Armand explains to David that by some means beyond his understanding he survived, and ended up on a rooftop in a stairwell protected from further exposure to the sun. However, he is badly burned and unable to move or fully function. While in this delirious state, he makes a mental connection to an adult and child in a nearby apartment—Sybelle and Benji. The connection is forged through Sybelle's constant piano playing.

Eventually, Armand is able to reach out to the children and lead them to him. They believe he is an angel, but are moderately unsurprised when Armand divulges his true nature to them. Armand cannot hunt, so the two agree to trick a drug dealer up to the apartment so that Armand may feed on him. The plan works, and ultimately Armand is fully healed. He becomes friends with Sybelle and Benji and ultimately falls in love with them. He shares his wealth with them without limit, mirroring the relationship Marius had with him to a certain degree.

Armand brings them to see Lestat, which he has some concerns about since vampires are traditionally not safe for mortals to be around. After trying to wake Lestat from his catatonic state, Armand returns to Marius's house to discover that Marius has given Benji and Sybelle the Dark Gift. Armand is at first furious at Marius because he wanted Sybelle and Benji to have full, mortal lives. The fact that Benji is ecstatic about the prospect of eternal life, only serves to fuel his anger. Marius explains to Armand that he did it since Armand never could without the two coming to hate him for it. Marius is willing to take the burden of Sybelle and Benji's eventual anger.

== Reception ==
Tustin Amole of Scripps Howard News Service said: "Rice returns to her best in “Armand”" and "Long-time readers will not be disappointed." Michael McLeod of Orlando Sentinel wrote: "Her vampires are immortal, but nobody said her prose was. In the end, Armand is cut from the same shroud as the other novels, filled with more camp than culture."

The book reached number 5 on The New York Times Best Seller list.
