= Delainey Hayles =

British actress (born 1999)

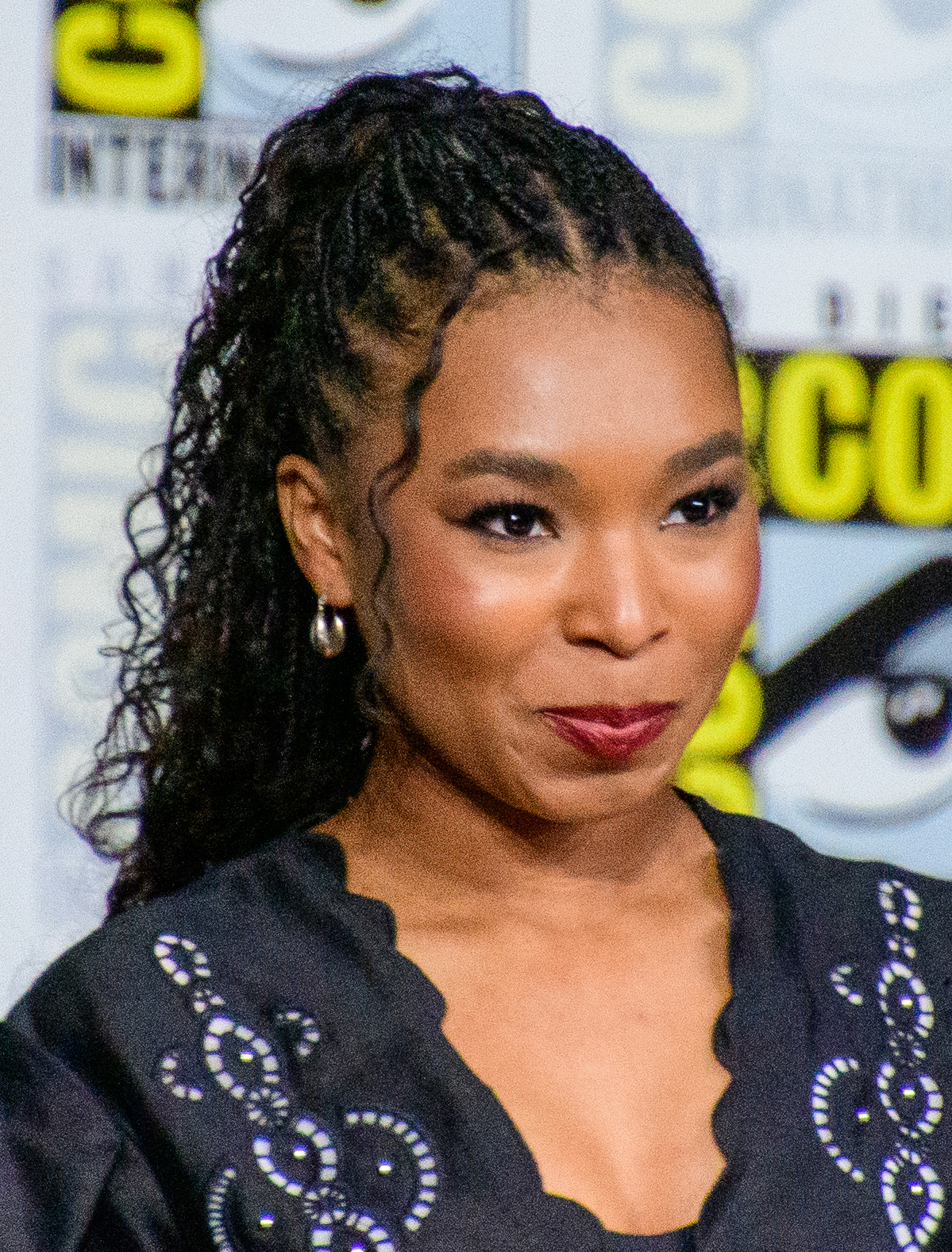
- Hayles in 2024
- Born: 10 March 1999 (age 27); London, England
- Education: The BRIT School/ The National Youth Theatre
- Occupation: Actress
- Years active: 2018–present

Delainey Hayles (born 10 March 1999) is a British actress. She is known for her role as Claudia in the AMC television series Interview with the Vampire since 2023.

Hayles has appeared in various television series, short films, and stage productions, including the role of Lucy Pevensie on stage in The Lion, the Witch, and the Wardrobe (2022).

== Early life ==
Delainey Hayles was born in England on 10 March 1999. She attended the BRIT School.

As a child, she reenacted and filmed Disney Channel episodes with her younger sister, sparking her interest in acting.

== Career ==
=== Film and television ===
Hayles launched her professional on-screen acting career in 2019 with Something In The Closet, a BFI funded short film directed by Nosa Eke.

In 2021, she played Billie in the miniseries Too Close, directed by Susan Tully and based on the 2018 novel by Clara Salaman. Hayles went on to play a recurring character in Holby City. That same year, she appeared in the short film Birds.

In 2023, Hayles took over the role of Claudia in the AMC television series Interview with the Vampire, replacing Bailey Bass, who played the character in the first season. Despite joining the production close to the start of filming, Hayles credits the cast and crew, particularly co-star Jacob Anderson, with creating a welcoming and supportive environment on set. Several early reviews of season 2, which aired in 2024, highlighted Hayles' performance and praised her portrayal of Claudia. In their round-up of the best television episodes of 2024, TV Insider commended Hayles' "powerhouse performance" in the season two episode, I Could Not Prevent It, stating that she "anchored" the episode.

=== Theatre ===
In 2018, Hayles performed with The Andrew Lloyd Webber Bridge Company in Sticky at the Southwark Playhouse. In 2022, Hayles starred as Lucy Pevensie in The Lion, the Witch, and the Wardrobe, directed by Michael Fentiman, at the Gillian Lynne Theatre in London's West End.

== Filmography ==
Year	Title	Role	Notes
2019	Something in the Closet	Asha	Short film
2021	Too Close	Billie	Episode 1.2
2021–2022	Holby City	Billie Faber	6 episodes
2022	Birds	Maya	Short film
2024–2026	Interview with the Vampire	Claudia, Regina	Main role
2026	Carrie	Caitlin	Recurring role

== Stage ==
Year	Title	Role	Notes
2018	Sticky	Keira	Southwark Playhouse, London
2022	The Lion, the Witch, and the Wardrobe	Lucy Pevensie	Gillian Lynne Theatre, London
