= Lives of the Mayfair Witches =

Series of supernatural horror novels by Anne Rice

- First edition cover of The Witching Hour (1990)
- Books: The Witching Hour (1990); Lasher (1993); Taltos (1994); Crossovers: Merrick (2000); Blackwood Farm (2002); Blood Canticle (2003)
- Author: Anne Rice
- Country: United States
- Language: English
- Genre: Gothic; supernatural; horror; fantasy
- Publisher: Knopf
- Published: 1990–1994
- No. of books: 3
- Preceded by: The Vampire Chronicles

Lives of the Mayfair Witches is a trilogy of Gothic supernatural horror fantasy novels by American author Anne Rice. It centers on a family of witches whose fortunes have been guided for generations by a spirit named Lasher. The series began in 1990 with The Witching Hour, followed by the sequels Lasher (1993) and Taltos (1994). All three novels debuted at No. 2 on The New York Times Best Seller list.

Some characters from the trilogy cross over to Rice's The Vampire Chronicles, a series of gothic horror novels featuring the vampire Lestat de Lioncourt, specifically featuring in Merrick (2000), Blackwood Farm (2002), and Blood Canticle (2003).

A television series adaptation, Mayfair Witches, debuted on AMC in 2023.

== Overview ==
Lives of the Mayfair Witches chronicles the multi-generational saga of the Mayfairs, a wealthy, matriarchal dynasty of witches originally from the Scottish Highlands who settle in the Garden District of New Orleans by way of Saint-Domingue (modern-day Haiti). The family's immense wealth, supernatural gifts, and tragic history are governed by a strict legal and spiritual inheritance: in each generation, one female descendant is designated as the "designee," inheriting the vast Mayfair fortune, the ancestral First Street mansion, and an emerald heirloom.

Central to the dynasty is Lasher, an ancient, shape-shifting spirit who entered into a pact with the family's first recognized witch, Suzanne of the Mayfair, in 17th-century Donnelaith, Scotland. For three centuries across thirteen generations, Lasher serves, seduces, and manipulates the designees. While he enriches the family and dispatches their enemies, his ultimate goal is biological: to orchestrate a precise genetic lineage that will allow him to take physical form in the mortal world.

The family's history is monitored from afar by the Talamasca, a secretive, centuries-old order of scholars and paranormal investigators headquartered in London and Amsterdam. The Talamasca operates under a strict code of passive observation, amassing exhaustive records on the Mayfairs while seeking to understand Lasher's true nature, without directly intervening in the family's affairs.

As the series progresses, the narrative expands from the traditional Southern Gothic horror and family chronicles into speculative biological fiction. The later novels reveal that Lasher belongs to the Taltos, an ancient, highly evolved, and near-extinct humanoid species with unique reproductive and physical traits, shifting the series' focus toward evolutionary tragedy, prehistoric folklore, and the consequences of genetic manipulation.

== Novels ==
=== The Witching Hour (1990) ===
The Witching Hour introduces Rowan Mayfair, a brilliant San Francisco neurosurgeon who possesses psychic abilities, including the power to heal and unintentionally kill. After she rescues Michael Curry, an architect from New Orleans who nearly drowns in the San Francisco Bay, Michael develops a psychometric sense in his hands. The two are contacted by the Talamasca, a secret scholarly order that investigates the supernatural, led by investigator Aaron Lightner. Through the Talamasca's records, Rowan discovers she is the thirteenth designee and matriarch of the Mayfair dynasty, a wealthy New Orleans family intertwined with an ancient spirit named Lasher.

Rowan and Michael fall in love and travel to New Orleans to restore the family's ancestral home on First Street. The novel details the extensive three-hundred-year history of the Mayfair family across thirteen generations, spanning from 17th-century Scotland and Saint-Domingue to modern Louisiana. Throughout their history, Lasher has guided and seduced the family's witches, intending to engineer a genetic combination powerful enough to allow him to take physical form.

After Rowan marries Michael and conceives a child, Lasher accelerates his plan. He brings about the death of Rowan's mother, Deirdre, and uses Rowan's genetic lineage and psychic power to incarnate directly into the physical world as a fully formed biological humanoid entity. After nearly drowning Michael in the swimming pool, A traumatized Rowan flees with Lasher to Europe.

=== Lasher (1993) ===
Picking up immediately after the events of The Witching Hour, Lasher follows Rowan's captivity in Europe alongside the newly incarnated Lasher. Rowan discovers that Lasher is not a demon, but a member of an ancient humanoid species known as the Taltos. Lasher seeks to mate with Rowan to propagate his species; however, the attempts result in repeated miscarriages and severely endanger Rowan's health, though she eventually gives birth to a female Taltos infant named Emaleth.

Back in New Orleans, Michael Curry recovers from his injuries with the assistance of Aaron Lightner and Mona Mayfair, a precocious young cousin of the family. Mona seduces Michael, becoming pregnant with another Taltos child. In Europe, Rowan manages to escape Lasher's control and returns to the United States in critical condition.

Lasher travels back to the Mayfair residence on First Street to confront Michael and claim his intended family. Michael kills Lasher and buries his remains beneath an oak tree on the grounds. Shortly thereafter, Emaleth arrives at the estate and revives a comatose Rowan using her milk. Horrified upon waking as she realizes what Emaleth is, Rowan orders Michael to kill the infant, leaving the couple deeply alienated and traumatized.

=== Taltos (1994) ===
Taltos expands the mythology of the ancient humanoid species, introducing Ashlar, a wealthy and benevolent Taltos living in New York who has survived for millennia by integrating into human society. Upon learning of the death of Lasher and the Mayfair family's ordeal, Ashlar becomes entangled in their affairs and seeks to understand how his extinct kind resurfaced in modern times.

Meanwhile, danger arises from within the Talamasca when a rogue faction murders Aaron Lightner and targets his colleagues. In New Orleans, Mona Mayfair gives birth to her daughter, Morrigan, who matures into adulthood within hours of birth. Ashlar arrives in New Orleans, where he is welcomed by Rowan and Michael, and connects with Morrigan.

Through Ashlar's recollections, the history and tragedy of the Taltos are revealed: a peaceful, long-lived, prehistoric race driven to near-extinction by human expansion, religious persecution, and climatic shifts in ancient Britain. Ashlar ultimately takes Morrigan into hiding to protect her and preserve their species in seclusion, while Rowan and Michael choose to sever ties with the supernatural realm to rebuild their lives and family together.

== Characters ==
- Dr. Rowan Mayfair: The primary protagonist of the trilogy and the thirteenth designee of the Mayfair family fortune. Adopted and raised in California unaware of her heritage, Rowan is a gifted neurosurgeon possessing immense psychic powers, including telekinesis, healing abilities, and the capacity to cause lethal brain hemorrhages.
- Michael Curry: A New Orleans-born contractor and Victorian architecture specialist. After a near-drowning incident in San Francisco where he is saved by Rowan, Michael develops extrasensory powers. He becomes Rowan's husband and the emotional anchor attempting to preserve normalcy at the First Street estate.
- Lasher: An ancient, shapeshifting preternatural entity bound to the Mayfair bloodline since seventeenth-century Scotland. Possessing seductive charm and violent power, Lasher serves the family designees in exchange for their devotion. His ultimate ambition is biological: to manipulate the family's genetics across thirteen generations so he may be physically born into the mortal realm as a member of the ancient humanoid species known as the Taltos. It has been suggested that Lasher is actually the true protagonist of the trilogy's first book, The Witching Hour.
- Aaron Lightner: A distinguished, elderly British investigator and psychic member of the Talamasca. Gentle and empathetic, Lightner acts as a mentor and historical guide to both Rowan and Michael, attempting to protect them from Lasher's manipulations while caught between his loyalty to the couple and the Talamasca's strict vow of non-interference.
- Mona Mayfair: A precocious, fiercely independent young Mayfair cousin and prodigy with both advanced computer literacy and potent psychic awareness. Despite her youth, Mona is deeply aware of the family's magical legacy and plays a pivotal role in the latter two novels through her romantic involvement with Michael and the rapid birth of her Taltos child, Morrigan.
- Ashlar: An ancient, billionaire business executive who is revealed in Taltos to be one of the last surviving members of the prehistoric Taltos race. Having survived for thousands of years by adapting to human civilization and embracing Christianity in ancient Britain, Ashlar serves as the mythological and historical counterpoint to Lasher, seeking to protect the surviving remnants of his kind.

== Reception ==
For the Chicago Tribune, Alexander Theroux wrote, "The Mayfair witches are easily the largest dysfunctional family on earth, and yet, perhaps not surprisingly, face the same soap-opera problems of any other extended family—jealousy, sex, drink, rape, revenge, inexplicable pregnancy, sudden death, crazed children and occasional murder." Of the extended Mayfair family, Patrick McGrath noted, "Mayfairs often come to bad ends, generally either burning to death or falling from high places, and we meet many members of many generations of them".

The Mary Sue described the series as "half narrative, half exposition of the entire family tree". The website also noted the "overuse of incest" and casual treatment of horror and violence, which "permeates the Gothic atmosphere."

Publishers Weekly wrote that "Rice plumbs a rich vein of witchcraft lore, conjuring ... the decayed antebellum mansion where incest rules, dolls are made of human bone and hair, and violent storms sweep the skies each time a witch dies and the power passes on."

== Adaptations and crossovers ==
=== Crossovers in other Rice novels ===
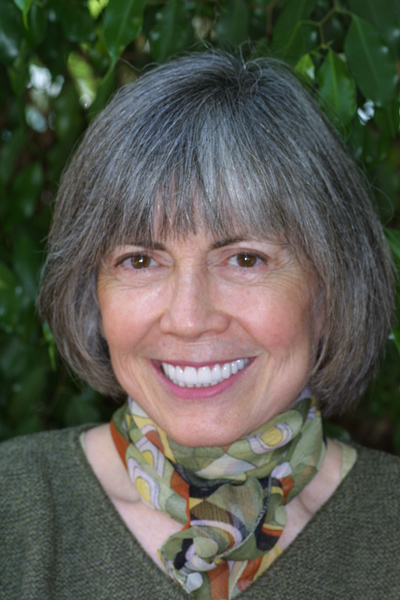
American author Anne Rice created both Lives of the Mayfair Witches and The Vampire Chronicles.

Some Mayfair Witches characters cross over to Rice's The Vampire Chronicles, specifically in the novels Merrick (2000), Blackwood Farm (2002), and Blood Canticle (2003). In the crossover novels, former Talamasca leader David Talbot seeks out Merrick Mayfair, an octoroon descendant of Julien Mayfair, on behalf of the vampire Louis de Pointe du Lac. Mona and Rowan Mayfair are later brought into the narrative.

==== Merrick (2000) ====
With the help of former Talamasca leader-turned-vampire David Talbot, Louis de Pointe du Lac asks the beautiful witch Merrick Mayfair to use her spiritual powers to contact the spirit of Claudia, a child who, like Louis, had been turned into a vampire by Lestat but was destroyed long ago. Merrick is also a former agent of the Talamasca, and shared many adventures with David in the past. Flashbacks introduce Merrick's malevolent sister, Honey Isabella or Honey in the Sunshine; Merrick's mother, Cold Sandra; and the Great Nananne, a powerful witch whose very presence is enough to frighten and instill respect in David. Merrick and David recall their journey to a cave in Central America which contained malevolent spirit protecting an ancient jade mask, which allows people to see spirits as if they were corporeal. Merrick retrieves Claudia's diary from the Talamasca vaults, and makes it possible for Louis to speak with Claudia. After being made a vampire, Merrick reveals that from the beginning, she used her magic to lure David and Louis to her in hopes of receiving the Dark Gift of vampirism.

The novel introduces Merrick Mayfair, a powerful witch who is a cousin of the Mayfairs in the Mayfair Witches series. Published on October 17, 2000, Merrick debuted at No. 2 on The New York Times Best Seller list.

==== Blackwood Farm (2002) ====
Tarquin "Quinn" Blackwood, heir to a powerful old family in New Orleans, asks for Lestat's help to get rid of Goblin, an increasingly malevolent spirit who has plagued Quinn for his entire life. Quinn recalls his youth, his family, and his forced transformation into a vampire by Petronia. His stories allow Lestat to better understand the reach and power of Goblin, and clue in Lestat to the fact that Quinn is connected to the Mayfair family of witches. After his own failure defeating Goblin, Lestat asks Merrick for assistance. Meanwhile, Quinn has fallen in love with heiress Mona Mayfair, and the ghost of their mutual ancestor Julien Mayfair warns him against making Mona a vampire. Goblin is revealed to be the spirit of Quinn's twin Gawain, who died days after being born. He is bound to Quinn, and is relentlessly jealous to experience whatever Quinn does. Merrick performs a ritual using Gawain's corpse to exorcise Goblin. She sacrifices herself by carrying the child's spirit into the hereafter with her, and Lestat is heartbroken.

The novel brings Mayfair Witches character Mona Mayfair into The Vampire Chronicles. Published on October 29, 2002, Blackwood Farm debuted at No. 4 on The New York Times Best Seller list.

==== Blood Canticle (2003) ====
Mona is slowly dying, afflicted with a mysterious disease brought on by the birth of Morrigan. Over time, Mona and Rowan reveal more and more about the powerful genetic plague that has haunted the Mayfairs for generations: their connection to the Taltos, an advanced species of human to which both women have given birth. Lestat turns a dying Mona into a vampire so that she and Quinn can be together forever. While trying to prevent Mona's family from discovering her transformation, Lestat falls in love with the married Rowan, and she secretly pines for him as well. Mona adjusts to her new power. Lestat, Quinn and Mona arrive at the remote island colony of the Taltos, but instead of finding a secluded utopia, they discover that years of criminal intrigue and civil war have taken their toll. The remaining Taltos join the Mayfair clan in New Orleans. Mona and Quinn are instructed in the proper ways of vampirism by the ancient vampire Maharet and her twin Mekare. Rowan seeks out Lestat, half in love with him but torn by her love for her husband Michael. Exhausted by her life, she requests that he make her a vampire. Lestat declines, pained though he is, because she is a guiding force for the Mayfair family and he cannot take her away from it.

Rowan and Mona are major characters in the novel, and Publishers Weekly called Blood Canticle "the complete unification of the Mayfair witch saga with that of the Vampire Chronicles". The publication added that "the vampirization of young Mona, a true child of our times, gives Rice a dynamic new vampire personality with whom to play."

Published on October 28, 2003, Blood Canticle debuted at No. 5 on The New York Times Best Seller list.

=== Audiobooks ===
Random House Audio originally released abridged audiobook adaptations of all three Mayfair Witches novels on audio cassette, with narrators Lindsay Crouse (The Witching Hour), Joe Morton (Lasher), and Tim Curry (Taltos). They were re-released as a three-book "Value Collection" on CD in 2005, and digitally in 2013. In 2015, new unabridged audiobook adaptations were released digitally by Random House Audio for all three novels in the trilogy, performed by Kate Reading.

=== Television ===
Development rights to The Lives of the Mayfair Witches were still held by Warner Bros in December 2019, when Rice began shopping a package combining film and TV rights to both The Vampire Chronicles and Mayfair Witches. Rice was reportedly asking around $30 to $40 million, plus a $2.5 million buyout of Warner Bros.' rights, and the new owner would hold the rights in perpetuity, not just as an option. In May 2020, it was announced that AMC had acquired the rights to The Vampire Chronicles and Lives of the Mayfair Witches for developing film and television projects. Anne and Christopher Rice serve as executive producers on any projects developed. Rice said, "It's always been my dream to see the worlds of my two biggest series united under a single roof so that filmmakers could explore the expansive and interconnected universe of my vampires and witches. That dream is now a reality, and the result is one of the most significant and thrilling deals of my long career."

In December 2021, Deadline Hollywood reported that Anne Rice's Mayfair Witches had been given an eight-episode series order by AMC, with another Rice series, Interview with the Vampire, already in production at the network as part of their new Immortal Universe franchise. Mayfair Witches is written and executive produced by Esta Spalding and Michelle Ashford, and executive produced by Mark Johnson. The series stars Alexandra Daddario as Rowan Mayfair, Harry Hamlin as Cortland Mayfair, Tongayi Chirisa as Ciprien Grieve, and Jack Huston as Lasher. Recurring roles include Annabeth Gish as Deirdre Mayfair, Beth Grant as Carlotta Mayfair, Erica Gimpel as Ellie Mayfair and Jen Richards as Jojo Mayfair. The series debuted on AMC and AMC+ on January 8, 2023.
