= The Queen of the Damned =

1988 novel by Anne Rice

- First edition
- Author: Anne Rice
- Language: English
- Series: The Vampire Chronicles
- Genre: Gothic, Horror
- Published: September 12, 1988
- Publisher: Knopf
- Publication place: United States
- Media type: Print (Hardcover, Paperback) & audio book
- Pages: 448
- ISBN: 978-0394558233
- Preceded by: The Vampire Lestat
- Followed by: The Tale of the Body Thief

The Queen of the Damned (1988) is a vampire novel by American writer Anne Rice, the third in her The Vampire Chronicles series. It follows Interview with the Vampire and The Vampire Lestat. This novel is a continuation of the story that ends in a cliffhanger in The Vampire Lestat and explores the rich history and mythology of the origin of the vampires, which dates back to Ancient Egypt.

In March 2014, a new installment of Rice's series was announced, titled Prince Lestat, which Rice's son, novelist Christopher Rice, called "a true sequel to The Queen of the Damned". A film based mostly on The Queen of the Damned was released in 2002. The Interview with the Vampire television series is adapting the book for its fourth season under the name of Anne Rice's Queen of the Damned.

== Plot summary ==
Part One follows several people over the same period of several days. Several of the characters from the two previous books appear, including Armand, Daniel Molloy (the "boy reporter" of Interview with the Vampire), Marius de Romanus, Louis de Pointe du Lac, Gabrielle de Lioncourt and Santino. Each of the six chapters in Part One tells a different story about a different person or group of people. Two things unify these chapters: a series of dreams about red-haired twin sisters, and the fact that a powerful being is killing vampires around the world by means of spontaneous combustion.

Pandora and Santino rescue Marius, having answered his telepathic call for help. Marius informs his rescuers that Akasha has been awakened by Lestat de Lioncourt, or rather his rock music, for he has joined a rock band with mortals Alex, Larry and Tough Cookie. Having been awakened by Lestat's rebellious music, Akasha destroys her husband Enkil and plots to rule the world. She is also revealed as the source of the attacks on other vampires.

Part Two takes place at Lestat's concert. Jesse Reeves, a member of the secret Talamasca and relative of Maharet, is mortally injured while attending the concert, and is taken to be made into a vampire at Maharet's compound in California's Sonoma Mountains. The vampires from Part One later congregate in the compound. Meanwhile, Akasha abducts Lestat and takes him as an unwilling consort to various locations in the world, inciting women to rise up and kill the men who have oppressed them.

Part Three takes place at Maharet's compound, where Maharet tells the story of Akasha and the red-haired twins, Maharet and Mekare, to the other characters. Also present are Mael and Khayman, who already know the story.

In Part Four, Akasha confronts the gathered vampires, explaining that she plans to kill 90 percent of the world's human men and establish a new Eden in which women will worship Akasha as a goddess. If the assembled vampires refuse to follow her, she will destroy them. The vampires refuse, but Mekare enters and kills Akasha by severing her head and consuming her brain and heart. Amel passes into Mekare, thereby saving the lives of the remaining vampires. She becomes the new Queen of the Damned.

In Part Five, the vampires leave the compound and assemble at Armand's island resort in Florida to recover. They eventually go their separate ways. Lestat takes Louis to see David Talbot in London. After their brief visit with Talbot they depart into the night, an incensed Louis and his angry words filling Lestat with glee.

=== Origin of vampires ===
The Queen of the Damned deals with the origins of vampires themselves. The mother of all vampires, Akasha, begins as a pre-Egyptian queen, in a land called Kemet (which will become Egypt), many thousands of years ago. During this time two powerful witches (twins Maharet and Mekare) live in the mountains close to Nineveh. The witches are able to communicate with invisible spirits and gain simple favors from them. During this period there is a bloodthirsty, invisible spirit known as Amel who continually asks the two witches if they need his assistance, although they prudently decline the offer. The witches' village is destroyed and they are incarcerated by the king and queen, who desire their knowledge. When the witches offend Akasha, the queen condemns the twins. Enkil then orders his chief steward (who is Khayman as a mortal man) to rape the twins in his stead, which would prove their lack of power, before the eyes of the court. Afterward the witches are cast out into the desert. While making her way back home with a pregnant Maharet, Mekare curses the king and queen secretly with Amel. Eventually Amel inflicts such torment on Akasha and Enkil that they demand advice and help from the two witches.

Unhappy with the young king's policies, conspirators attempt to assassinate the royal couple in Khayman's house while they are attempting to exorcise Amel, who had also been tormenting Khayman. While the king and queen lie dying, the evil spirit sees its chance to ensnare the soul of the dying queen and pulls it back into her body. The spirit combines itself with the flesh and blood of the queen, transforming her into a vampire. Akasha allows the king to drink her blood, which saves his life. In desperation, she orders Khayman to find the witches and bring them back to Egypt, hoping the twins will use their knowledge of spirits to help the couple, as they are overwhelmed by their thirst for blood. However, when the witches admit that they cannot help the monarchs, Akasha orders the mutilation of the witches: Maharet loses her eyes and Mekare her tongue. Afterward, Khayman, who had been turned into a vampire by Akasha, comes to the witches' cell and turns them too. The three flee together, but are caught by Akasha's soldiers. Khayman escapes, but Maharet and Mekare are further punished. The witches are put into two separate coffins which are then set afloat on two separate bodies of water. They are only reunited near the end of the novel Queen of the Damned.

In Mekare's absence, Maharet returns to watch over her daughter and her descendants. Maharet's descendants become what she calls the Great Family. A maternal line, the Great Family includes every culture, religion, ethnicity, and race. The Great Family represents all humanity and shows the vampires what Akasha would destroy with the creation of her New World Order.

As the source of all vampires, Akasha is connected to all vampires by the blood and spirit they collectively share. In an experiment by the first Keeper, Akasha and Enkil are exposed to sunlight when they are several thousand years old. This merely darkens their skin. However, the result on all other vampires is extreme, and many of the weakest vampires die, thus confirming the legend that anything that harms Akasha will also directly affect all of her progeny.

== Reception ==
The New York Times praised the entertaining, rich worldbuilding in the historical segments but criticized the contemporary sections for their melodramatic dialogue and cliche-riddled prose. Kirkus Reviews called the novel "thin, unconvincing, and a grave disappointment". Publishers Weekly said that excessive philosophical musings slow down the otherwise well-crafted storyline.

The Queen of the Damned made its debut at number two on The New York Times Best Seller list. It ascended to the top spot in its second week and remained on the list for a total of 17 weeks.

== Adaptations ==
- Queen of the Damned (2002), film directed by Michael Rymer, based on novels The Vampire Lestat and The Queen of the Damned.
- Anne Rice’s Interview With The Vampire (2022–present), American television series on AMC; Season 4 based on The Queen of the Damned.
