= List of The Vampire Chronicles characters =

A complete, visual genealogical record of all vampire characters found in Anne Rice's series: The Vampire Chronicles and The Lives of the Mayfair Witches. Includes dates of vampiric embrace and, if applicable, dates of eternal death.

The following is a list of characters from Anne Rice's The Vampire Chronicles, which began with the 1976 novel Interview with the Vampire. The series primarily follows the antihero Lestat de Lioncourt, a French nobleman turned into a vampire in the 18th century, and by extension the many humans and vampires whose lives he has touched in his own long existence. Some characters from Rice's Lives of the Mayfair Witches trilogy cross over to The Vampire Chronicles, specifically in Merrick (2000), Blackwood Farm (2002), and Blood Canticle (2003).

Rice said in a 2008 interview that her vampires were a "metaphor for lost souls". The homoerotic overtones of The Vampire Chronicles are also well documented. As of November 2008, The Vampire Chronicles had sold 80 million copies worldwide.

The first novel in the series, Interview with the Vampire (1976), was made into a 1994 film starring Tom Cruise, Brad Pitt, Antonio Banderas, Christian Slater and Kirsten Dunst. The Queen of the Damned (1988) was adapted into a 2002 film of the same name, starring Stuart Townsend, Marguerite Moreau, Vincent Pérez and Aaliyah and using some material from 1985's The Vampire Lestat. A television adaptation, Interview with the Vampire, premiered on AMC on October 2, 2022, starring Sam Reid and Jacob Anderson.

== Overview ==
Character	Interview with the Vampire (1976)	The Vampire Lestat (1985)	The Queen of the Damned (1988)	The Tale of the Body Thief (1992)	Memnoch the Devil (1995)	The Vampire Armand (1998)	Pandora (1998)	Vittorio the Vampire (1999)	Merrick (2000)	Blood and Gold (2001)	Blackwood Farm (2002)	Blood Canticle (2003)	Prince Lestat (2014)	Prince Lestat and the Realms of Atlantis (2016)	Blood Communion (2018)	Portrayals in media			
Character	Interview with the Vampire (1976)	The Vampire Lestat (1985)	The Queen of the Damned (1988)	The Tale of the Body Thief (1992)	Memnoch the Devil (1995)	The Vampire Armand (1998)	Pandora (1998)	Vittorio the Vampire (1999)	Merrick (2000)	Blood and Gold (2001)	Blackwood Farm (2002)	Blood Canticle (2003)	Prince Lestat (2014)	Prince Lestat and the Realms of Atlantis (2016)	Blood Communion (2018)	Interview with the Vampire (1994 film)	Queen of the Damned (2002 film)	Lestat (2006 musical)	Interview with the Vampire (Note: Season 3 has been titled The Vampire Lestat.) (2022 TV series)
Main
Lestat de Lioncourt	Yes	Yes	Yes	Yes	Yes	Yes			Yes		Yes	Yes	Yes	Yes	Yes	Tom Cruise	Stuart Townsend	Hugh Panaro	Sam Reid
Louis de Pointe du Lac	Yes	Yes	Yes	Yes	Yes	Yes			Yes				Yes	Yes	Yes	Brad Pitt		Jim Stanek	Jacob Anderson
Armand	Yes	Yes	Yes		Yes	Yes				Yes			Yes	Yes	Yes	Antonio Banderas	Matthew Newton	Drew Sarich	Assad Zaman
Claudia	Yes	Yes	Yes	Yes		Yes			Yes							Kirsten Dunst		Allison Fischer	Bailey Bass (season 1); Delainey Hayles (seasons 2–3)
Marius de Romanus		Yes	Yes	Yes		Yes	Yes			Yes			Yes	Yes	Yes		Vincent Perez	Michael Genet	Christopher Heyerdahl
David Talbot			Yes	Yes	Yes	Yes			Yes				Yes	Yes	Yes		Paul McGann		
Pandora			Yes			Yes	Yes						Yes	Yes	Yes		Claudia Black		
Tarquin Blackwood											Yes	Yes							
Supporting
Daniel Molloy	Yes		Yes							Yes			Yes			Christian Slater			Eric Bogosian; Luke Brandon Field (young)
Jessica "Jesse" Reeves			Yes										Yes		Yes		Marguerite Moreau		
Bianca Solderini						Yes				Yes			Yes	Yes	Yes				
Merrick Mayfair									Yes		Yes								Sarah Afful
Rowan Mayfair (Note: Rowan and Mona Mayfair are introduced in the Lives of the Mayfair Witches trilogy (1990–1994).)											Yes	Yes							
Mona Mayfair											Yes	Yes							
Santiago	Yes															Stephen Rea			Ben Daniels
Madeleine	Yes															Domiziana Giordano			Roxane Duran
Gabrielle de Lioncourt (Note: named Gabriella de Lioncourt in the television adaptation.)		Yes	Yes			Yes							Yes	Yes	Yes			Carolee Carmello	Jennifer Ehle
Akasha		Yes	Yes				Yes			Yes							Aaliyah		Sheila Atim
Amel		Yes	Yes										Yes	Yes	Yes				
Nicolas de Lenfent		Yes																Roderick Hill	Joseph Potter
Magnus		Yes											Yes	Yes					Damien Atkins
Antoine (Note: Gender swapped to Antoinette in the television adaptation.)	Yes												Yes	Yes	Yes				Maura Grace Athari
Aaron Lightner (Note: Aaron Lightner also appears in the Lives of the Mayfair Witches trilogy (1990–1994).)			Yes						Yes										
Maharet and Mekare			Yes		Yes					Yes			Yes				Lena Olin (Maharet)		
Mael			Yes		Yes					Yes							Christian Manon		
Santino			Yes			Yes				Yes									
Khayman			Yes										Yes				Bruce Spence		
Azim			Yes																
Eric			Yes																
Memnoch					Yes														
Sybelle						Yes							Yes	Yes	Yes				
Avicus										Yes			Yes						
Eudoxia										Yes									
Thorne										Yes			Yes	Yes	Yes				
Teskhamen		Yes								Yes			Yes	Yes	Yes				
Stirling Oliver											Yes	Yes							
Rhoshamandes													Yes	Yes	Yes				
Seth													Yes	Yes	Yes				

== Main ==
=== Lestat de Lioncourt ===
Lestat is a French nobleman born and made a vampire in the 1700s, and the primary antihero of Rice's Vampire Chronicles. He was introduced in Interview with the Vampire (1976), and has been portrayed by Tom Cruise in the 1994 film Interview with the Vampire; Stuart Townsend in the 2002 film Queen of the Damned; and by Sam Reid in the 2022 television series Interview with the Vampire.

=== Louis de Pointe du Lac ===
Louis is a Frenchman made a vampire in New Orleans by Lestat, introduced in Interview with the Vampire (1976). Louis is portrayed by Brad Pitt in the 1994 film adaptation and by Jacob Anderson in the 2022 television series Interview with the Vampire.

=== Armand ===
Armand is a 500-year-old vampire with the appearance of a cherubic teenage boy, introduced in Interview with the Vampire (1976). When first encountered he is the leader of a coven of vampires living beneath a cemetery in Paris, His coven's rituals reflect their belief that they are damned creatures who only exist to serve Satan. When the coven breaks up, Armand is left with many existential questions. His previous life in Venice with Marius and his subsequent capture and indoctrination by vampires there who despised Marius's optimistic manner of living are disclosed in The Vampire Lestat and are expanded upon in The Vampire Armand.

The character is portrayed by Antonio Banderas in the 1994 film adaptation, by Matthew Newton in the 2002 film Queen of the Damned, and by Assad Zaman in the television show.

=== Claudia ===
Claudia is a child vampire introduced in Interview with the Vampire (1976). She is five years old when given the Dark Gift by Lestat as a means of keeping Louis as his companion, despite a long-standing rule in vampire society against making vampires out of children. Claudia's mind matures to adulthood, but she remains trapped in her vampiric child's body. She is noted as being particularly cold and monstrous, owing to her lack of human life experience. After decades together, she seeks revenge at her fate by attempting to kill Lestat, but is ultimately unsuccessful. Claudia travels with Louis through Europe in search of other vampires. Their search leads them to Paris, where they are captured by a coven of vampires led by Armand. Deemed an abomination, Claudia and her fledgeling companion Madeleine are destroyed by the light of the sun, which prompts a grief-stricken Louis to take revenge on the coven.

In The Vampire Armand, further details of Claudia's final days are revealed by Armand. She later appears as a vengeful spirit in Merrick.

Claudia is portrayed by Kirsten Dunst in the 1994 film adaptation, by Bailey Bass in the first season of the 2022 television series and by Delainey Hayles starting with the second season.This version of Claudia is turned at fourteen and becomes a member of Armand's Paris coven before Armand orchestrates her execution.

=== Daniel Molloy ===
Daniel Molloy is a young reporter introduced in Interview with the Vampire (1976) to whom Louis de Pointe du Lac recounts his life history. After hearing Louis' story, Daniel pleads to be turned into a vampire, causing Louis to attack him in anger. Daniel publishes the interview, though it is regarded by the general public as fictional. Whilst searching for a vampire to turn him, Daniel meets the vampire Armand, with whom he forms a romantic connection, and after many years is finally turned into a vampire in 1985.

The character is portrayed by Christian Slater in the 1994 film adaptation.

Eric Bogosian portrays Daniel in the 2022 television series, while Luke Brandon Field portrays a younger version of Daniel in flashbacks. In this adaptation, Daniel is a two-time Pulitzer Prize-winning journalist diagnosed with Parkinson's disease who, as a young man, interviewed Louis in 1973 San Francisco after a chance meeting at a gay bar. In 2022, Louis invites Daniel to interview him a second time at Louis' Dubai penthouse. After revealing Armand's involvement in the Paris trial, Daniel is turned into a vampire by Armand.

Between the events of the second and third season, Daniel releases Louis and Lestat's story in his book, Interview with the Vampire. The publication of the book damages his relationship to Louis due to the book ruining the latter's attempt to rekindle his relationship with Lestat, who was angered by the misrepresentation of him. In the third season of Interview with the Vampire (retitled to The Vampire Lestat), Daniel joins Lestat and his band on their tour in an attempt to film a documentary about the vampire, although he grows frustrated with Lestat's unwillingness to share information with him. During this time, he also reunites with his maker, Armand, who had been absent since turning him two years prior. By the end of the third season, Daniel turns on Louis and Lestat as him and Armand become companions.

=== Marius de Romanus ===
Marius is an ancient vampire, originally from Rome in the 1st century BC and introduced in The Vampire Lestat (1985). He is portrayed by Vincent Pérez in the 2002 film Queen of the Damned and by Christopher Heyerdahl in season three of the television series.

=== David Talbot ===
David is the Superior General of the secret organization the Talamasca, which researches and investigates the supernatural. David is introduced in The Queen of the Damned (1988). He meets both Lestat and Louis at the end of the novel. Lestat taunts David, offering to turn him with his powerful vampire blood, which David soundly refuses.

In The Tale of the Body Thief (1992), it seems he and Lestat have become friends. After Lestat tries to end his immortal life by flying into the sun in the Gobi Desert, he visits David. He also seeks advice from David when Raglan James offers to switch bodies with him, though he doesn't listen to what David has to say. David helps Lestat regain his body. In the struggle with Raglan James, David switches into a much younger body, described as that of an Anglo-Indian with dark brown hair, while Lestat returns to his preternatural body. Lestat kills David's old body, which is possessed by James. At the end of the book, Lestat forces the blood upon David, making him his fledgling. David becomes somewhat of a confidant to Armand, and eventually records the story of his life in The Vampire Armand (1998). He is also described as having sexual preferences for young women and men, preferring men in The Tale of the Body Thief.

David also appears in Merrick (2000), where he contacts the title character, who also happens to be part of the Mayfairs. In this book, Merrick raises the spirit of Claudia for Louis. In the end, it is revealed that Merrick has been using Vodou to bring both David and Louis to her so she can attain eternal life. This plan works, as Louis gives her the blood and makes her immortal. After he makes Merrick his fledgling, he tries to commit suicide by placing his coffin in the open where he would be burned to death when the sun rose. He nearly succeeds, but he is too old for the sun to end his life. David, Merrick, and Lestat find him and give him their blood to heal his burned form. Their combined blood makes Louis stronger than he had been before. The four then form a coven in New Orleans, but the Talamasca, enraged that three of their members had taken the blood, threaten the vampires and demand that Merrick, David, and Jesse return to them. Lestat wants to retaliate against the Talamasca, but David talks him out of doing anything rash, and the four leave their home in the Rue Royal.

In the third season of the 2022 television series, it is confirmed by Talamasca agent Raglan James that Talbot had been killed by Louis de Pointe du Lac some time prior.

=== Jessica "Jesse" Reeves ===
Jesse is a modern-day descendant of the ancient vampire Maharet. In the 1998 novel The Queen of the Dammed, Jesse is an agent of the Talamasca, a secretive organization which investigates the supernatural. She is assigned to investigate the events of Interview with the Vampire and The Vampire Lestat, revealed in a book by the vampire Lestat, to confirm they are not fictional.

Orphaned from birth when her mother died in a car crash, Jesse was placed with a foster family, watched over and financially supported by Maharet. As she grew up, Jesse began too see sprits and, upon reaching adulthood, formed a romantic connection with the vampire Mael.

Her investigation into Lestat causes her to encounter the spirit of Claudia, leaving her sick for weeks and removed from the investigation. Jesse then attends Lestat's concert, where she realizes he, Mael and Maharet are vampires. At the concert, a vampire fatally injures Jesse, causing Maharet to save her life by turning her into a vampire.

Jesse is portrayed by Marguerite Moreau in the 2002 film Queen of the Damned, in which the character is also Lestat's love interest.

=== Bianca Solderini ===
Introduced in The Vampire Armand (1998), Bianca is an Italian vampire born in Florence, Italy in the late 1470s. She has sharp grey eyes and wavy golden hair, which she often interweaves with pearls, and is often described as a woman painted by Botticelli.

Bianca lives a happy mortal life with her brothers until they die and she is forced to depend financially on her evil kinsmen, who are bankers. They provide amply for her as long as she kills those who they instruct her to kill. She does this by opening her house to virtually all as an amicable and graceful hostess and secretly placing poison in the wine cups of those whom her kinsmen want dead. Bianca is a renowned Venetian courtesan when Marius comes to know her. Marius immediately falls in love with her and becomes obsessed with her, contemplating making her a vampire. A few years after the two meet, Armand arrives on the scene and also falls in love with Bianca. The three form an amiable sort of love triangle before the Children of Darkness, led by Santino, destroy Marius's palazzo, burn Marius, and take away Armand. After the burning, Marius, severely weakened, mentally calls Bianca to him. Marius makes Bianca a vampire so that she can bring him victims so that he can heal.

The two stay together for nearly two hundred years, caring for Those Who Must Be Kept before Bianca leaves Marius in Dresden, when she overhears him telling Pandora that he would leave Bianca if it meant having Pandora with him once more. Marius also does not tell Bianca that rumors of Pandora in Dresden are the only reason they moved there. Armand later sees her in Paris in the early 19th century.

=== Merrick Mayfair ===
Introduced as the title character of Merrick (2001), Merrick is a member of the Talamasca and is acquainted with David Talbot. Merrick is suddenly contacted by David Talbot, now a vampire, after his "death". He asks her to raise the spirit of Claudia for Louis de Pointe du Lac. Louis wants to know if Claudia is at peace after her death. Merrick can do this since she is a powerful witch, as are many of the Mayfairs. When her godmother, Great Nannane, died there was no one who could take care of her because her sister (Honey in the Sunshine) and her mother (Cold Sandra) were deceased. There is also a matter of her raising. The Mayfair Family is Louisiana Creole and are of African and European extraction, but all are distanced from Merrick's immediate family. Orphaned, the young Merrick is taken in by David Talbot and Aaron Lightner and the Talamasca. As she grows her power increases and she studies to learn all that she can. She goes to high school and a university. Meantime she bonds with David and Aaron.

When she is an adult she returns to become a full member of the Talamasca. When David suddenly dies, she knows something is not right and Aaron tells her nothing. When she says farewell to David's dead body her suspicions are confirmed. She decides to find papers where information about David has been filed. Merrick finds out that David has helped the famous vampire Lestat de Lioncourt. Lestat's powerful vampire body has been stolen by a former member of the Talamasca, Raglan James. When they got Lestat's body back Raglan stole David's body instead and David ended up in the body of a young man. David's original body is destroyed when Raglan, in David's original body, tries to trick Lestat into giving him "the Dark Gift". When David contacts her, years later, Merrick knows all of this. She agrees to raise the spirit of Claudia.

When Merrick meets Louis, they fall in love, more or less. After the ceremony, Louis and Merrick express a desire to talk and David goes out. The next night he finds that Merrick has been made into a vampire by Louis. Merrick later confesses to David, Louis, and Lestat that it is what she's wanted ever since she found out about what happened to David. She also revealed that her ancestors had visited her dreams with a similar message of her fate. She used magic to bring David and Louis to her. When Louis later is dying after his attempt to burn himself in the sun to join Claudia, Lestat fully awakes from his sleep. He saves Louis by letting him drink from his powerful blood. Merrick is also allowed to drink and joins the little coven. Later a young vampire named Quinn calls upon Lestat and asks for help in Blackwood Farm (2002). The spirit of his dead twin brother (named Goblin) had been haunting him all his life, and now, when he is a vampire, Quinn is the victim of several attacks. Lestat can not help Quinn on his own and asks Merrick for help, and she agrees. She explains the nature of spirits and says that Goblin refuses "to go into The Light". She performs a kind of exorcism, but to make the spirit "go into the Light" she ends her own life and they both "go into the Light" together. It was earlier revealed by Lestat that Merrick was suffering, which all new vampires do due to their new nature.

Merrick is portrayed by Sarah Afful in the third season of the 2022 television series.

=== Rowan Mayfair ===
Rowan is a Mayfair witch who appears in the novels The Witching Hour (1990), Lasher (1993), Taltos (1994), Blackwood Farm (2002) and Blood Canticle (2003).

=== Mona Mayfair ===
Mona is a Mayfair witch who appears in the novels The Witching Hour (1990), Lasher (1993), Taltos (1994), Blackwood Farm (2002) and Blood Canticle (2003). She is made a vampire by Lestat de Lioncourt in Blood Canticle.

=== Tarquin Blackwood ===
Tarquin is initially featured in the novel Blackwood Farm (2002) and later in Blood Canticle (2003). He has an oval face, with features that are almost too delicate, sharp, intelligent blue eyes and jet black hair, cut short that is slightly curly. He stands at an impressive height of six feet four inches (1.93 m), and is of a slight, handsome build.

Tarquin Anthony Blackwood was born in 1980 to Patsy Blackwood who was only 16 at the time. Quinn is looked after by his grandfather Pops, grandmother "Sweetheart" and Jasmine, a servant, who helps run the house, Blackwood Farm just outside New Orleans. Quinn has spent his entire life accompanied by a spirit named Goblin. The first clear memory Quinn has of Goblin was his birthday party when he was 3 years old which is also the first instance known of Goblin being able to physically touch Quinn by pushing his hand and forcing him to ruin a birthday cake. He is given a harmonica for his birthday by his grandfather, Pops which he loves to play although Goblin hates it because Quinn pays him no attention whilst playing it.

At the age of 7, whilst playing in the old cemetery with Goblin, Quinn sees a group of ghosts huddled together. Quinn is quite interested in these spirits which fade only to come back again, but as they don't move or talk he simply leaves them, much to the relief of Goblin. Quinn becomes a vampire and fledgling of Petronia. Soon after he is made, Arion (maker of Petronia) gives Quinn his blood so that Quinn is stronger. Arion tells Quinn that they must only feed upon people who have committed evil deeds (the "evil-doer" as they are commonly referred to). Quinn accepts this and is then told by Petronia to pick someone from the 3 servants in the house to feed upon. These are the same servants Quinn met when still alive so Quinn is reluctant to feed on any of them even though he can now see they have all committed some very bad deed. Quinn eventually kills one female servant and afterward, Manfred also lets Quinn drink from him. Quinn then sees the ghost of Rebecca but ignores her now as he believes that to be finished now that he has died. Quinn is taken to hunt with Arion, Petronia, and Manfred and here discovers that he can fly. The four of them arrive at a wedding full of "evil-doers" but Quinn mistakenly kills the bride who was not evil at all. Petronia, obviously enraged by this, begins beating Quinn until Arion stops it. The sun rises and Quinn sleeps during the day, dreaming of killing his mother Patsy.

The next night Arion teaches Quinn how to hunt properly and teaches him about what he now is, a vampire. On returning to Petronia and Manfred they explain "the rules" to him: that the Talamasca is now his enemy and also that hunting in New Orleans is forbidden because Lestat de Lioncourt won't allow it. Quinn decides to return to Blackwood Farm. Even though Petronia and Arion ask him not to, he makes preparations to leave straight away. When Quinn arrives at Blackwood Farm, Goblin attacks him and feeds on him, drinking his blood. Goblin attacks Quinn every time Quinn feeds on someone, and his attacks are becoming stronger each time. Petronia visits Quinn at the island in the swamp and leaves him The Vampire Chronicles so he can understand things a bit better. On reading the books, he decides to find Lestat to ask for his help in dealing with Goblin. Quinn writes a letter to Lestat explaining a little about him and Goblin and asking for his help. He also encloses a cameo of himself for Lestat. Quinn takes this letter to Lestat's flat in New Orleans where he finds Stirling Oliver. Stirling can clearly see what Quinn is now and although Quinn tries to fight against it, he feeds on Stirling Oliver until he is pulled away from him. The person who pulled him away was Lestat who quickly deals with Stirling Oliver by warning him not to try it again and also not to make any mention of Quinn in any report he might make to the Talamasca.

Lestat takes Quinn's letter and then takes him to feed and afterward Quinn is attacked by Goblin. Lestat goes with Quinn back to Blackwood Farm where they spend a bit of time talking to Aunt Queen about cameos and their history. When Lestat and Quinn are alone, Goblin returns to feed on Quinn but Lestat burns him as he does so. Quinn then tells Lestat the story of himself and Goblin (and his entire life). After the story is done they hear a noise and Quinn discovers Goblin has killed Aunt Queen. Lestat suggests Merrick can perhaps help get rid of Goblin.

At the wake of Aunt Queen, Quinn is alone as Lestat has gone to find Merrick Mayfair. Quinn notices Petronia there who has left Aunt Queen a cameo. Quinn also witnesses the ghost of Julien Mayfair who warns him against turning Mona into a vampire. Quinn leaves after seeing Rowan and Stirling Oliver arrive. Quinn is accompanied by Lestat and Merrick to the funeral where he speaks about Aunt Queen, as do many people. Also, Quinn, out of habit, goes up to receive communion, and Lestat and Merrick follow him.

After the funeral, Merrick tells Quinn to go home with his family and to keep Patsy in particular at home. When Merrick and Lestat arrive at Blackwood Farm, Quinn is told that Goblin is in fact the ghost of his twin brother who died shortly after they were born. Quinn doesn't believe this until Patsy confirms it and says his name was Gawain and that it was Quinn's fault that his brother died. Quinn hears the same story from Jasmine and her grandmother. Goblin leaves a message on the computer saying he wants Lestat and Merrick gone and that he hates Quinn. Quinn then gives Merrick all the information he can about Goblin so she can get rid of him. Quinn kills Patsy and the ghost of Rebecca appears and is satisfied because he killed her and leaves. Quinn drinks from Lestat so he has enough strength for what is going to happen next. A fire is built and Quinn and Lestat watch as Merrick performs a ritual that involves the remains of Goblin/Gawain. The ritual ends with Merrick jumping into the fire with Goblin and even though Lestat pulls her out and tries to save her, she is dead.

Quinn and Lestat visit Oak Haven and speak to Stirling Oliver telling him about Merrick so that the Talamasca know what happened to her. Stirling Oliver tells Quinn that Mona Mayfair is dying. Quinn and Lestat leave the Talamasca to hunt. They arrive back at Blackwood Farm where they find Mona waiting for Quinn, dying. Quinn tells her what he is and Lestat makes her into a vampire for Quinn.

== Supporting ==
=== Santiago ===
Santiago is a vampire and the leading thespian of Theatre des Vampires, introduced in Interview with the Vampire (1976). He is portrayed by Stephen Rea in the 1994 film adaptation and Ben Daniels in the second season of the 2022 television series Interview with the Vampire.

=== Madeleine ===
Introduced in Interview with the Vampire, Madeleine is a human dollmaker whom Louis turns into a vampire at Claudia's request. She and Claudia become very close, and when Claudia is condemned to death by exposure, Madeleine is destroyed with her. She is portrayed by Domiziana Giordano in the 1994 film adaptation and Roxane Duran in the second season of the 2022 television series Interview with the Vampire.

=== Gabrielle de Lioncourt ===
Gabrielle is Lestat's mother, introduced in The Vampire Lestat (1985). She is Lestat's first fledgling, and the second to leave him after Nicolas de Lenfent. She has yellow-blond hair like her son's and cobalt-blue eyes with "too small, too kittenish" features, as Lestat described them, that "made her look like a girl".

Gabrielle comes from a prosperous Italian family. She was educated and had traveled to and lived in many cities in Europe. Then she was married at a young age to Lestat's father, Marquis d'Auvergne. Gabrielle gave birth to seven children, but only 3 survived. Out of these sons, the youngest (Lestat), was to become her favorite. She and Lestat shared a special bond: they both were trapped in a place they hated and struggling endlessly to escape. Gabrielle was cold and uncaring to everyone. She was the only person who was educated in her family and read her books every day, yet lacked the patience to teach her sons to read or write anything.

Over the years she sold two of her heirloom jewels from an Italian grandmother to aid Lestat, the only person she loved and cared for. She lived life through him; he was the male part of her. She suffered a rapidly declining health due to bad winters and multiple childbirths. It eventually developed into tuberculosis. She funded Lestat's trip to Paris with Nicolas by giving him gold coins and advising him to hitch a ride on the postal carriage. Lestat became an actor there and was far happier than he ever was back home. He was grateful and loved his mother for all that she had done for him over the years so he sent letters to her telling her about his life in Paris. She encouraged his acting career, which gave him a lot of strength. She carefully hid her rapidly declining health to keep him strong.

Lestat was made into a vampire by Magnus, and inherited near-inexhaustible wealth when Magnus killed himself in a bonfire. He repaid those who helped him with gold and indulged in his new-found wealth. To hide the truth from Gabrielle, Lestat told her tales of going to the Bahamas, marrying a rich woman, and coming into vast wealth. Intrigued, she went to Paris to see her son before she died. Lestat went to see his mother the second night she was in Paris and tried to hide the truth from her, but she found out upon closer inspection of Lestat's changed appearance that he had become a vampire. When Gabrielle began dying right in front of him, a desperate Lestat made her a vampire. Lestat was now the maker, parent, and teacher, while Gabrielle became the fledgling, the child, and the student. Lestat took her to his tower where they lived happily for months. Things changed, however, when Lestat destroyed the Satanic cult headed by Armand, founded a theatre, and made Nicolas into a vampire. After this, Lestat and Gabrielle went traveling around the world. Gabrielle became increasingly distant and cold to her son. They finally parted in Egypt just after the French Revolution.

Gabrielle went into the deep jungles of Africa and Lestat went underground to sleep. Gabrielle was off exploring the world on her own for the next 200 years. She did not reappear until 1985 (during 1988's The Queen of the Damned.) She was there to help her son fight against Akasha and help save the world. During this time, she developed a slight bond with Marius, but nothing became of it and she drifted away from everyone again. Gabrielle resurfaced for the last time after Memnoch the Devil, in The Vampire Armand (1998) while Lestat was in his catatonic sleep.

In the 2006 musical, Lestat, Gabrielle was portrayed by Carolee Carmello who was nominated for a Tony Award for Best Performance by a Leading Actress in a Musical for her role. Jennifer Ehle portrays the character, now Gabriella de Lioncourt, in the third season of the television series.

=== Akasha ===
Introduced in The Vampire Lestat, Akasha is the progenitor of all vampires. Born into a noble family in Uruk, Akasha becomes queen of Kemet c. 5000 BC through her marriage to Enkil, Kemet's reigning king. Akasha and Enkil are tormented by Amel, a malicious spirit. An ethereal, invisible being, Amel is envious of beings with physical bodies unlike himself. During an assassination attempt on Akasha and Enkil, Amel enters a dying Akasha's body through her stab wounds and fuses his essence with her blood, making Akasha the first vampire. In turn, she makes Enkil a vampire, and together they create many others. After millennia, Akasha and Enkil's telepathic powers become so powerful that they lose themselves in the thoughts of others, becoming catatonic living statues who must be hidden and protected, any harm or pain befalling Akasha being shared by all vampires, as they are all connected through her spirit-infused blood; if she is injured, so are her children, and if she dies, so do all vampires. Called "Those Who Must Be Kept", Akasha and Enkil are cared for by a series of ancient vampires in numerous locations around the world, and the truth of their origins becomes lost over the centuries. In the late 1800s, Lestat discovers Those Who Must Be Kept in the care of Marius. Lestat drinks Akasha's powerful blood, drastically enhancing his vampiric powers. In 1985, Lestat awakens Akasha with his rock music in The Queen of the Damned. Akasha kills Enkil, absorbing his power, and takes Lestat as her new consort. She wreaks global havoc, telepathically inciting mass riots in human populations, and destroys nearly every other vampire on the planet. The few remaining vampires are forced to put aside their grievances and form a plan to stop her.

Akasha is portrayed by Aaliyah in the 2002 film Queen of the Damned and Sheila Atim in the third season of the television series.

=== Nicolas de Lenfent ===
Nicolas "Nicki" de Lenfent is Lestat's closest friend and lover in Paris, introduced in The Vampire Lestat (1985). Lestat is abducted from their bed and made a vampire by Magnus. Lestat later makes Nicki a vampire as well, which only amplifies Nicki's depression. Nicki was portrayed by Roderick Hill in the 2006 musical Lestat, and was also portrayed by Joseph Potter in the second and third season of the television series Interview with the Vampire.

=== Magnus ===
Magnus is the vampire who turned Lestat into a vampire in The Vampire Lestat (1985). Magnus is characterized by black hair and eyes of the same color. As a mortal, he was an alchemist. He was an old man when he trapped the vampire Benedict in chains and stole the Dark Gift/Blood for himself. That happened at some point during the Middle Ages. According to the "Old Queen" (Allesandra) of Armand's coven in Paris, Magnus was 300 years old when he made Lestat, which would put his year of birth in the late 15th century. Over time, he was driven mad by his vampiric nature and his immortality. Before killing himself, he sought an heir to inherit the immense wealth that he had accumulated over the years. Magnus searched for years for an heir, with no success. In his dungeon, he had hundreds of decomposing bodies stored in a room, the discarded remains of his search for a suitable heir. Every one of these candidates had blond hair and blue eyes, just as Lestat does. After choosing Lestat as his heir and giving him explicit instructions to scatter his ashes after he had burned up, Magnus leaped into a pyre that he had made for himself. He left Lestat to struggle and learn for himself of his new vampiric nature and its powers. Lestat would later lament that he learned "absolutely nothing" from the one who made him.

Magnus is portrayed by Damien Atkins in the third season of the television series.

=== Antoine ===
Introduced in The Vampire Lestat, Antoine is a French musician, exiled to Louisiana and made a vampire by Lestat. He returns in Prince Lestat (2014).

Antoinette, a gender swapped version of the character, appears in the 2022 television series Interview with the Vampire, portrayed by Maura Grace Athari. In the story, she is a blues singer taken as a lover by Lestat. Eventually, Louis and Claudia insist that Lestat kill her as a condition of reuniting their family. Lestat pretends to, presenting her severed finger as proof, but instead makes her a vampire to spy on Louis and Claudia. The pair ultimately destroy her in their incinerator.

=== Aaron Lightner ===
Aaron is a member of the Talamasca who possesses a particular interest in the Mayfair Witches. Introduced in The Queen of the Damned (1988), the character appears in the entire Lives of the Mayfair Witches trilogy (1990–1994) as well as the 2000 crossover novel Merrick.

=== Pandora ===
Pandora is an ancient Roman woman, previously named Lydia, whom Marius de Romanus is forced to make a vampire, and who helps him care for Those Who Must Be Kept for centuries.

=== Maharet and Mekare ===
Maharet and Mekare are four-thousand-year-old twin witch sisters from ancient Mount Carmel valley who inadvertently began the cycle of vampirism in the world by summoning the demon spirit Amel, who possesses a dying Akasha and turns her into a vampire. Maharet is the blood ancestor of Jessie.

=== Mael ===
Mael is mentioned briefly in The Vampire Lestat. Along with Marius de Romanus and Pandora, he is one of the legendary ancient vampires. When Marius tells the young Lestat the story of his life, he says that Mael was the druid priest who abducted him to become the new "God of the Grove". Marius escaped. Mael later returns in The Queen of the Damned (1988). He is a companion to Maharet and also seeks to protect her mortal descendant Jesse Reeves. Mael is present when Maharet tells Jesse her story when they later try to reason with Akasha, and when Mekare kills her.

The third appearance by Mael is at the end of Memnoch the Devil. Lestat goes to Heaven and Hell with the Devil, Memnoch, and he brought back Veronica's Veil, causing chaos among mortals and bringing out many of the ancients. Mael tells David Talbot and Lestat that he is going to burn himself in the sun for God. Mael is ancient and thereby too strong for the sunlight to kill him ordinarily, but he believes that the presence of the Veil negates his supernatural powers (but not his vulnerabilities). The final implication is that Mael dies as the novel ends, but it is revealed by Marius in Blood and Gold (2001) that Mael survived his suicide attempt; "He was badly burnt and brought low, as can happen with us who are very old, and after one day in the sun, he hadn't the courage for more suffering. Back to his companions, he went and there he remains."

He appears in Blood and Gold when Marius tells Thorne about his life, in which Mael is included. Marius has just left Pandora when he meets Mael and his maker Avicus in Rome, the city he moved to. When Marius had escaped and the old god had been killed (because they had Marius), Mael is chosen to become the new "God of the Grove". The druids find out about Avicus in England and they travel there. When they get there Avicus uses "the Mind Gift" on Mael and learns about Marius's escape. To give Mael "the Dark Gift" Avicus wants a victim and freedom, but it all ends up with that Mael is turned into a vampire and they escape together. Mael and Avicus become companions and eventually meet Marius in Rome, where they reveal all this. There is a lot of anger between Mael and Marius while Avicus tries to keep them from fighting. They come to peace where they all live in the city.

Mael and Avicus keep the city clean from The Children of Darkness, but one night Mael is injured and Marius agrees to help. Marius must give Mael blood so he can heal and then Mael sees visions of Those Who Must Be Kept. Gradually they get to know more and more, and Avicus seems to have been made by Akasha before becoming "A God of the Grove". Mael is furious that Marius kept such an important secret to himself, about that Marius destroyed his belief and about the connection between Avicus and Marius. Marius eventually takes them to Those Who Must Be Kept and Mael tries to drink from Akasha. Enkil does not like it and Marius saves Mael in the last minute from being killed by Enkil. Later when Rome is falling Marius goes to sleep and they try to wake him but do not succeed. A hundred years later they decide to leave for Constantinople and finally successfully awaken Marius. In Constantinople, they separate, and then Mael becomes Maharet's companion.

=== Santino ===
Santino is the leader of a coven of Satanic vampires, the members of which hold a common belief that they are meant to be the scourge of humankind. He approaches Marius in Rome, some 500 years before Marius meets Lestat, and confronts him about Those Who Must Be Kept, whom Marius has been thinking of. This startles Marius greatly, as he is much older than Santino, so reading his mind should be impossible. He decides to scare the young Santino, by setting his cloak on fire and telling him to leave. Marius does not hear of Santino again until sometime later, when Mael tells Marius of his meeting with Santino. Santino and his satanic coven ultimately attack Marius's Venetian home, his followers burning his house and killing some of the boys he harbors. Marius is badly burned from this incident and his fledgling Armand is taken, along with a number of Marius's boys. The coven burns the boys alive in a giant fire. Santino rescues Armand, claiming to his followers that the young fledgling has a heart for God. Armand does not come over to the darker life of the coven so easily though. With the help of his follower Allesandra, they keep Armand locked up in their crypt, starving him for days before allowing him to feed. Eventually, Armand gives in and is accepted as Santino's apprentice. After some time Armand is chosen to become the leader of the Paris coven, whose former leader went into the fire. Allesandra picks the name Armand for him as a new name and goes with him to Paris.

Santino is not heard of again until in the novel The Queen of the Damned (1988) where he comes with Eric to Maharet's place, meeting Jesse who is still human at that time and where he accompanies Pandora to rescue Marius from the icy wall in which Akasha has entrapped Marius, possibly hoping to redeem himself in his eyes for the wrongs he had done to the elder. After the events of Queen of the Damned, he stays for a time on Armand's Night Island, occasionally playing chess with Armand.

He is also mentioned in The Vampire Armand (1998), when Armand, after going into the sun sees both his old master and his old coven master destroying evidence the humans had of vampires existing. Marius never takes his revenge against Santino for destroying his life in Venice and taking his Armand from him (at first because he doesn't have the opportunity and later because the new vampire queen forbids vampires from killing each other, as their numbers are low). Marius harbors a deep hatred for Santino, and centuries later tells his story to a vampire companion named Thorne. When Marius and Thorne met Santino, Thorne slays Santino with the Fire Gift so that Marius's heart will be at rest. This results in Thorne's confinement.

=== Khayman ===
Khayman is a powerful and ancient vampire introduced in The Queen of the Damned (1988). He was the third vampire in existence, after Akasha and her consort, Enkil.

=== Azim ===
Azim is the ancient "blood god" who has ruled in a Himalayan temple for a thousand years. He collects worshippers into his temple using his vampiric gift and drains their blood during the frenzied ceremonies. Azim is described by Pandora as plump, bronze-skinned, and wrapped in a lavish robe and a silk turban. Despite being "as old as Marius" and therefore powerful, Akasha invades his temple and kills him with a flick of her hand, his skull detonated and his body incinerated by her primal power.

=== Eric ===
Eric is mentioned only in The Queen of the Damned (1988) and The Tale of the Body Thief (1992). Eric is made a vampire by Maharet around 1000 BC at the mortal age of twenty-nine. His origin and past life are unknown. He survives Akasha's worldwide slaughter due to his immortal age of three thousand years and is one of the immortals who gathered at Sonoma to stand against Akasha. His first and only appearance is in Queen of the Damned where he came to Maharet, Jesse, and Mael with his Italian companion, Santino, who argued with Maharet via telepathy. As they leave, Santino is furious and Eric confused because he did not understand their argument; being Maharet's fledgling, he couldn't read Maharet's mind. It was also stated that there were times that he came to visit Maharet, Mael, and Jesse while bringing with him films from other countries and sometimes joining the three in their singing. Being a vampire of 3,000 years of age, he is very powerful, his skin is hard and as white as marble and therefore couldn't easily burn under the sun. He is also described as having a youthful appearance and soft brown eyes. His brief conversations make him out to have a deceptively fragile personality. His cowardice in particular makes him stand out.

=== Memnoch ===
Memnoch is an incarnation of the fallen angel Satan, the devil. He is referenced in The Tale of the Body Thief (1992), and is a central character in the eponymous Memnoch the Devil, in which he hunts and abducts the vampire Lestat, to convince the latter of his ideology and to enlist him into his cause.

=== Avicus ===
Avicus is an ancient vampire who appears in Blood and Gold (2001). Avicus is far older than Marius, but he does not know his own strength, although it is implied in Blood and Gold that his powers are second to those of Marius. Avicus is from Egypt, and some statements in Blood and Gold indicate that he was created by Akasha herself. The powerful blood he supposedly received and his age give him his strength. If he was not created by Akasha, then his powers have most certainly increased with age, as he was a "God of the Grove" for hundreds of years.

When the druid priest Mael needs a new "God of the Grove" (due to Marius's escape and the destruction of the old "God of the Grove") it's decided that Mael is to become the new "God of the Grove". The Druids learn about Avicus, who can be found in England, though the book indicates the forests to the north. This is most likely Scotland which, at the time when the book is set, had a large druid presence and was completely covered by the Caledonian forest. They travel there to get Avicus, but Mael and he make an arrangement — Avicus will give Mael the Dark Gift if he is given a victim and freedom. After becoming the God Of The Grove and learning (from using the Mind Gift on Mael) that Marius had successfully escaped, Avicus also wants to escape. Ultimately, Avicus and Mael escape together and thus become companions. They eventually meet up with Marius and the three live together for a time.

In Constantinople, Marius, Avicus, and Mael discover Zenobia, a vampire fledgling of the ancient Eudoxia. Mael, Avicus, and Zenobia are left behind by Marius when he takes Those Who Must Be Kept out of Constantinople. Over 1,000 years later, Marius learns from Mael that Avicus was in love with Zenobia and persuaded her to leave with him, abandoning Mael. Mael blames Marius for this, as he blamed Marius for all his misfortunes in ancient times.

=== Eudoxia ===
Eudoxia is a vampire who appears in Blood and Gold (2001). After the Fall of Rome, Marius de Romanus, Avicus and Mael move to Constantinople with Those Who Must Be Kept. Shortly after their arrival, they are contacted by the young vampires Asphar and Rashid. They ask them to come to Eudoxia, "the vampire empress" in the city. When her guests arrive she tells them her story. She was around fifteen and about to get married when she was abducted by a vampire. She was then also made one. She never names her maker, but they stayed together for several years.

Eudoxia's maker was very cold and uncaring. After a few years, she is taken to Those Who Must Be Kept to drink their blood and is directly after left by her maker. She decides to make copies of different texts for mortals in order to know the world. While she's at this she opens her house to mortals, and an unnamed young man falls in love with her. He offers to leave his life for her and Eudoxia makes him into a vampire. They spend a few years together until the Great Fire. The power of all vampires resides in Those Who Must Be Kept and one of the Elders of their temple has put it to the test. All young vampires are burnt to death as they are in the sun, including Eudoxia's lover.

She travels to Egypt and finds out that Those Who Must Be Kept are in the custody of Marius. She spends her life trying to find him. She does not succeed and forms a coven in Constantinople. Her companions are Rashid, Asphar, and Eudoxia's vampire lover Zenobia. All of them are young when made because Eudoxia thinks they are better off without a connection to their mortal life. When Marius finally comes to the city, she confronts him. She demands to get possession of Those Who Must Be Kept, but Marius cannot allow this. He doesn't know if he can trust Eudoxia or what Those Who Must Be Kept want. The meeting ends in a fight where Eudoxia is defeated, despite being the elder of the pair, as Marius had drunk more of the blood of Akasha. In the fight, Marius discovers that he has the Fire Gift when he uses it to burn Rashid to ashes.

The next night Eudoxia shows up at Marius's house and he agrees to let her see the shrine. As she talks to Akasha and Enkil, Akasha takes her and drinks her blood but Eudoxia is saved by Marius. To heal, Eudoxia needs a victim for feeding. They find a real nobleman, but they let the people know that he has been murdered. The blame falls on Marius and they destroy his house. In his anger, he destroys Asphar and all other vampires before he throws Eudoxia to Akasha, where she meets her destruction.

=== Thorne ===
Thorne is a vampire who appears in the novel Blood and Gold (2001), which details the life of the vampire Marius de Romanus. Thorne is a Viking warrior originally called Thornevald that is sent to slay a vampire-witch that has been killing villagers and stealing their eyes. Thorne finds the vampire and learns that she has no eyes of her own, and must take eyes from her victims to see. After a time, the mortal eyes wear out in her immortal body and she must take another pair from one of her victims. This vampire is Maharet, one of the most ancient vampires, and the story of how she lost her eyes is recounted in The Queen of the Damned (1988).

Maharet does not slay Thorne but turns him into a vampire and keeps him as her companion. Soon the pair are joined by other vampires, including the druid vampire Mael, who shares an uneasy friendship with Marius. Jealous of Maharet's attention to the other vampires, Thorne eventually leaves her. He lies asleep for centuries in the ice of the far north, his jealousy gradually growing into a mad obsession. He is awakened by the events of the novel The Queen of the Damned. Marius makes contact with him using the Mind Gift, a form of telepathy. Thorne journeys south and finds Marius in a large city near the Arctic Circle. Marius enjoys it here as the noonday darkness allows him to live more like a normal person. Marius takes him to his home and discovers that Thorne still harbors a jealous rage for Maharet.

Knowing that Maharet could easily destroy Thorne in a battle, Marius tries to dissuade him from his suicidal obsession and begins to recount his life story to Thorne. Marius's story accounts for the bulk of the novel. Thorne politely listens to Marius's account of his life and what he has learned as a vampire. Thorne is particularly interested in the story of the brutal attack on Marius by the vampire Santino and his Satanic cult of followers, who burn Marius in his house and kidnap his apprentice Armand. At the end of the tale, Thorne questions Marius why he has not taken revenge on Santino and offers to help kill him. Marius explains that Maharet now rules the vampires as regent for her mute sister, Mekare, and Maharet forbids it. Marius pleads with Thorne to forget the past and talk of revenge, but Thorne still insists on Marius taking him to see Maharet. Marius reluctantly agrees and the pair are mysteriously whisked away. They awaken in a jungle location, where Maharet lives in seclusion with her sister, the new Queen of the Damned. Several other vampires are present, including Pandora, Marius's long-lost love; Armand; and Santino.

After a brief, bitter discussion, Marius admits that he still wishes to kill Santino. However, he will not because Maharet forbids it, and Marius believes that for Maharet's rule over the vampires to be valid, all vampires must obey her. Thorne abruptly kills Santino himself and then attacks Maharet in a jealous rage. Mekare comes to her sister's aid and easily pulls Thorne away. Thorne, knowing he is undone, whispers a request to the mute Queen as they struggle and she complies. Mekare removes Thorne's eyes from their sockets and hands them to Maharet. Maharet accepts the gift and binds Thorne with ropes made of her hair, the only material strong enough to hold a vampire.

Thorne ends the novel as Maharet's eternal prisoner, but he is happy knowing that the object of his obsession will always be near him and that her new eyes will last her forever.

=== Teskhamen ===
Teskhamen is the "Blood God" from the grove, maker of Marius de Romanus, elder and founder of Talamasca.

=== Stirling Oliver ===
Stirling Oliver is an elderly member of the Talamasca, introduced in Blackwood Farm (2002). An observer of the Mayfairs, he is attacked by Tarquin Blackwood, but saved by Lestat, who warns him not to report to the Talamasca that Quinn is a now a vampire.

=== Rhoshamandes ===
Rhoshamandes is a peace-loving vampire, part of the Queen's Blood contingent of vampires. Made directly by Akasha, one thousand years after the Blood Genesis or 1,000 after Akasha herself was made — to be more precise, in the year 3000 BC. His fledglings include Allesandra — the old vampire that Lestat has met during his descent to the catacombs beneath Les Innocents cemetery in Paris, Benedict — a monk turned vampire from whom Magnus stole the Dark Gift, Eleni and Eugénie de Landen — made in the early Middle Ages, as well as Everard de Landen, also made in the Middle Ages. Eleni is the female fledgling who informed Lestat of their progress in the new Theatre Coven led by Armand in The Queen of the Damned. She was presumed dead due to Armand trying to extinguish the coven, as he was the leader.

=== Seth ===
Seth is the son of Akasha and Enkil. He is made a vampire by his mother and is initially a member of her immortal army, but he eventually rebels against his parents and disappears for millennia. He emerges in the modern age, becoming the protector of Fareed, a doctor turned vampire. He first appears in the novel Prince Lestat (2014)
