= Armand (The Vampire Chronicles) =

- The Vampire Chronicles character
- Antonio Banderas as Armand (1994)
- First appearance: Interview with the Vampire (1976)
- Last appearance: Blood Communion: A Tale of Prince Lestat (2018)
- Portrayed by: Antonio Banderas (1994 film); Matthew Newton (2002 film); Drew Sarich (2006 musical); Assad Zaman (2022 TV Series)

In-universe information
- Aliases: The Vagabond Angel; Child of Satan; Boss (By Daniel Molloy).
- Nicknames: Andrei (Vampire Chronicles); Arun (2022 TV series); Amadeo
- Species: Vampire
- Gender: Male
- Title: All Father
- Occupation: Coven leader
- Significant others: Bianca Solderini; Louis de Pointe du Lac; Daniel Molloy; Marius De Romanus
- Children: Sybelle (adoptive daughter); Benjamin Mahmoud (adoptive son)
- Relatives: Ivan (father)
- Religion: Orthodox (as a human); Catholic
- Nationality: Eastern Slav (Vampire Chronicles)

Armand is a fictional character in The Vampire Chronicles novels written by Anne Rice. At the end of the series, he is approximately 500 years of age. His outward appearance is that of a beautiful adolescent boy, 5’6, with curly auburn hair, large brown eyes and slender fingers. His features are at times compared figuratively to those of Cupid or a Botticelli angel.

== Fictional biography ==
Armand is born in 1481 in the former Kievan Rus' to the acclaimed hunter Ivan. His original name is Andrei.

As a child he can paint vivid pictures of Jesus Christ, Madonna, and the Eastern Orthodox Saints. His astonished parents eventually reveal his gift to the monks in the Monastery of the Caves, who live ascetically underground, sustained only by water and small amounts of food.

When their ruler, Prince Michael, orders Andrei to paint an icon and bring it to the castle of his brother, the supposedly dead Prince Feodor, Andrei is captured by Tartars, brought as a slave to Constantinople, and subsequently sold to a Venetian brothel, where he is sexually abused and develops amnesia.

Marius, a 1500-year-old vampire living as a painter in Venice, rescues Andrei and gives him an education and a luxurious life, and renames him Amadeo. Marius is in love with a courtesan named Bianca Solderini, yet cannot bring himself to turn her into a vampire. Instead, he chooses Amadeo for his beauty, youth, and painting skills (apparently lost, along with his memories) to educate "in the way of the blood", so as to eventually make him a vampire.

Amadeo loves Marius single-mindedly and is eager to become a vampire. He does not understand Marius' hesitation to turn him, and in an act of rebellion and anger he seduces an English lord whom, after a few nights, he eventually abandons. The English lord becomes obsessed with Amadeo and, enraged by his betrayal, wounds him with a poisoned blade, forcing Marius to turn Amadeo into a vampire to save his life. Amadeo is 17 years old at the time of his transformation.

By the time of The Vampire Lestat, Armand has been running a coven known as the Children of Darkness in Paris for 300 years, which has caused him to sink into despair. He abducts the fledgling Lestat's lover, Nicholas "Nicki" de Lenfent, leading to a confrontation between the two vampires which leaves Armand furious and causes him to kill many coven members. Afterwards, Armand seeks companionship from Lestat, who rejects him to seek out Marius instead.

Lestat leaves Armand, the remaining coven members and a depressed, vampiric Nicki in charge of his theatre, which they convert into the Theatre des Vampires. Armand and Nicki begin creating increasingly disturbing plays the coven can use as a way to drain humans on-stage. When Nicki becomes increasingly violent and risks exposing his identity as a vampire, Armand imprisons him and cuts off his hands, before eventually assisting him to commit suicide.

After the incidents in Interview with the Vampire, Daniel Molloy tries to find Lestat but is instead found by Armand. Daniel links Armand to the new time, and they form a relationship. Daniel grows more impatient, longing to be turned to a vampire, and he and Armand become estranged. By 1985, Daniel destroys his health to the point that he is near death, so Armand finally turns him into a vampire. Daniel is Armand's only fledgling to date, and they cannot stay together afterward.

In Memnoch the Devil, Armand is driven mad when Lestat returns from a journey to Heaven and Hell and shows him the Veil of Veronica. He walks into the sun and is seemingly killed.

In The Vampire Armand, Armand is revealed to have survived the incident from Memnoch the Devil after being protected by the young mortals Benji and Sybelle, who he begins looking after in return.

== Portrayal in other media ==
- In the 1994 film Interview with the Vampire, Armand was portrayed by Antonio Banderas.
- In the 2002 film Queen of the Damned, Armand was portrayed by Matthew Newton.
- In the 2006 musical, Lestat, Armand was first portrayed by Jack Noseworthy, who left the role a week after the pre-Broadway performance began, and was then replaced by his understudy Drew Sarich, who went with the production onto Broadway.
- In the 2022 AMC TV series Interview with the Vampire, Armand is portrayed by Assad Zaman.
