= In Throes of Increasing Wonder... =

- Interview with the Vampire episode
- Episode no.: Season 1 Episode 1
- Directed by: Alan Taylor
- Written by: Rolin Jones
- Cinematography by: David Tattersall
- Editing by: Leo Trombetta
- Original air date: October 2, 2022
- Running time: 66 minutes

Guest appearances
- Steven G. Norfleet as Paul de Pointe du Lac; Kalyne Coleman as Grace de Pointe du Lac; Assad Zaman as Rashid; John DiMaggio as Alderman Fenwick; Chris Stack as Thomas "Tom" Anderson; Rae Dawn Chong Florence de Pointe du Lac; Jeff Pope as Finn O'Shea; Dana Gourrier as Bricktop Williams; Christian Robinson as Levi

Episode chronology
| ← Previous — | Next → "...After the Phantoms of Your Former Self" |

"In Throes of Increasing Wonder..." is the series premiere of the American gothic horror television series Interview with the Vampire, an adaptation of Anne Rice's novel of the same name. Written by series creator Rolin Jones and directed by executive producer Alan Taylor, the episode premiered in the United States on AMC on October 2, 2022.

The plot depicts the beginning of the interview session between Louis de Pointe du Lac (Jacob Anderson) and Daniel Molloy (Eric Bogosian) about Louis' life story as a vampire, particularly since meeting Lestat de Lioncourt (Sam Reid) in 1910 in New Orleans.

In the United States, the episode garnered a viewership of 1.2 million on both AMC and AMC+ during its premiere night, with 0.6 million viewers on linear television alone. It received critical acclaim for its premise, direction, writing, tone, cinematography, score, production design, costumes, characterization, and the performances of Anderson and Reid. Several publications named it among the best television episodes of the year.

== Plot ==
In 2022, journalist Daniel Molloy receives a package from his old friend Louis de Pointe du Lac who lives in Dubai. The package contains a series of tapes and a handwritten letter offering to conduct a do-over interview with him, a project that they had begun 49 years earlier but failed to complete due to Louis attacking Molloy, sparked by Molloy's "disrespectful" remarks to Louis about "human life". As soon as Molloy arrives at Louis' penthouse apartment in Dubai, the two begin their first interview session.

Louis' story goes back to the year 1910 in New Orleans. He works as a pimp and owns eight brothels, inherited from his father. One night, Louis gets into an argument with his brother Paul, sparked by Paul praying outside the brothel and bothering one of Louis' workers. Also present is vampire Lestat de Lioncourt who witnesses the argument.

Louis later meets Lestat while visiting Miss Lily, a sex worker with whom he covers up his closeted homosexuality and whom he has affection for, at her workplace. Louis finds her talking to Lestat and interrupts their conversation. As Lestat continues to talk and tease Lily, Louis finds himself unable to move. The following night, Louis and Lestat meet again in a game of cards. During the game, Lestat communicates with Louis telepathically while, at the same time, physically talking to the other players. He then freezes time and switches the other players' cards around, allowing Louis to win the game. As a result, the two begin to develop a friendship.

Lestat is later invited by Louis to have dinner with the Du Lac family. During dinner talk, Paul's question to Lestat about whether he is "one with Christ" angers him and causes him to almost use his powers on the family but Louis stops him. Afterwards, Lestat brings Louis to his residence, where Miss Lily is waiting upstairs. As the three have sex, Lestat seduces Louis telepathically. After Lily falls asleep, Louis and Lestat share a passionate kiss. Lestat then bites Louis' neck and the two levitate. However, despite the ecstasy of the experience, his feelings terrify Louis and he decides to stop seeing Lestat.

The morning after their sister Grace's wedding, Paul commits suicide by jumping off their house's roof. His mother blames him and accuses Louis of saying something that led to Paul's death. Later, Lestat ambushes Paul's funeral and asks Louis to come to him. Louis, who has had enough of his mother's blame, chooses not to go to the wake. He goes looking for Lily and learns of her death. Tormented by Lestat's constant mind control, he decides to go to the church for help. While Louis admits his sins in the confessional, Lestat enters the church and kills the priests. In response, Louis draws a knife and stabs Lestat several times but to no effect. Eventually, Louis allows himself to be turned into a vampire after hearing Lestat's words that it will help him overcome his sorrow.

== Production ==
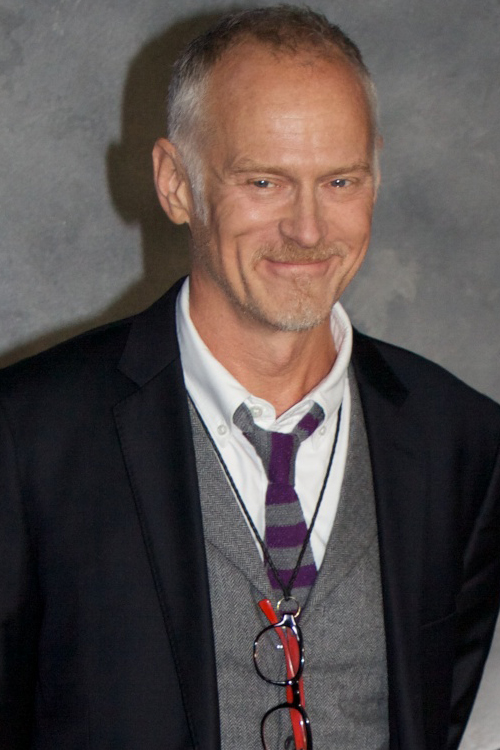
Executive producer Alan Taylor directed the series premiere.

=== Conception and writing ===
On May 13, 2020, AMC Networks announced that it had made an agreement to acquire two of Anne Rice's literary works, The Vampire Chronicles and Lives of the Mayfair Witches, consisting of 18 novels. On June 24, 2021, the series was given an order for an eight-episode first season by AMC, adapting the first novel of The Vampire Chronicles novel series, Interview with the Vampire, scheduled to premiere in 2022. Rolin Jones was announced to serve as writer, executive producer, and showrunner. Mark Johnson, Rice and her son Christopher were also named executive producers. On July 19, 2021, Alan Taylor was announced to also executive produce the series and direct the first two episodes of the first season. The series premiere "In Throes of Increasing Wonder..." was written solely by Jones.

=== Casting ===
The episode stars Jacob Anderson as Louis de Pointe du Lac, Sam Reid as Lestat de Lioncourt, and Eric Bogosian as Daniel Molloy. The recurring cast includes Steven G. Norfleet and Kalyne Coleman as Louis' brother and sister Paul and Grace, and Assad Zaman as Rashid.

Reid and Anderson were announced as Lestat and Louis, respectively, in August 2021. Coleman joined the recurring cast on October 13, 2021. Zaman and Bogosian's casting was announced in March 2022.

=== Filming ===
Principal photography for the first season began on November 8, 2021, and completed on May 18, 2022, with filming taking place in New Orleans. Among several filming locations, the Beauregard-Keyes House served as the façade of the Du Lac's family house, while the inside of the Gallier House served as the interiors of the family home. Apart from real-life locations, filming also took place on newly built sets, including Storyville. Executive producer Alan Taylor served as the episode's director, while David Tattersall worked as the cinematographer.

== Release ==
"In Throes of Increasing Wonder..." premiered on AMC, on October 2, 2022, but was released one week earlier on the network's streaming service AMC+.

== Reception ==
=== Ratings ===
On linear television, an estimated 0.622 million viewers watched "In Throes of Increasing Wonder..." during its first broadcast on AMC, with a 0.15 ratings share. Across all platforms, according to AMC Networks, 1.2 million viewers watched the premiere on AMC, including 0.493 million adults aged 25–54, in Nielsen live+3 ratings, making the series the number one new drama on ad-supported cable in 2022. On AMC+, the series premiere ranked as the number one new series launch ever and put the series alongside The Walking Dead and Better Call Saul as one of the network's top three new or returning series, based on the opening weekend performance alone.

=== Critical reception ===
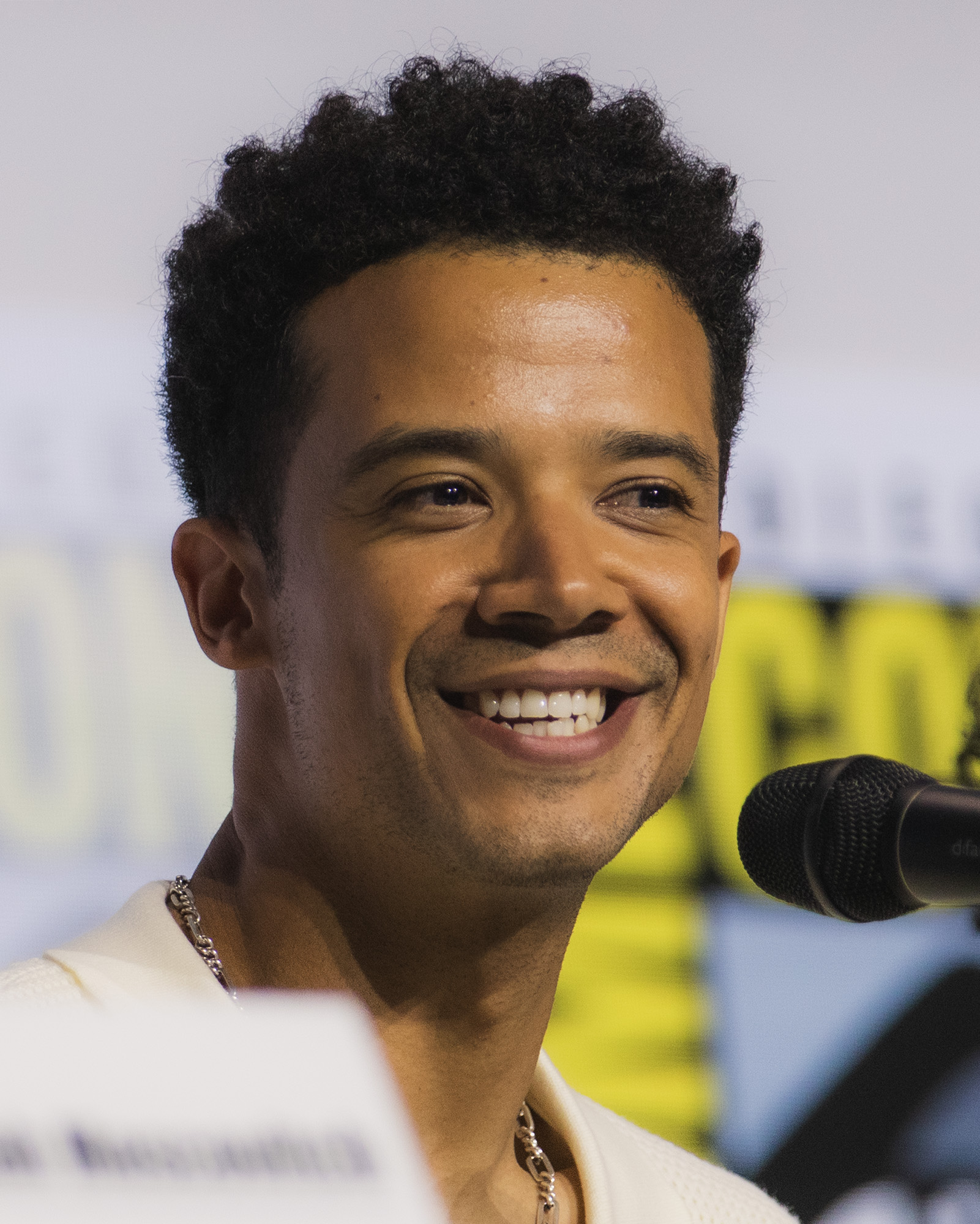
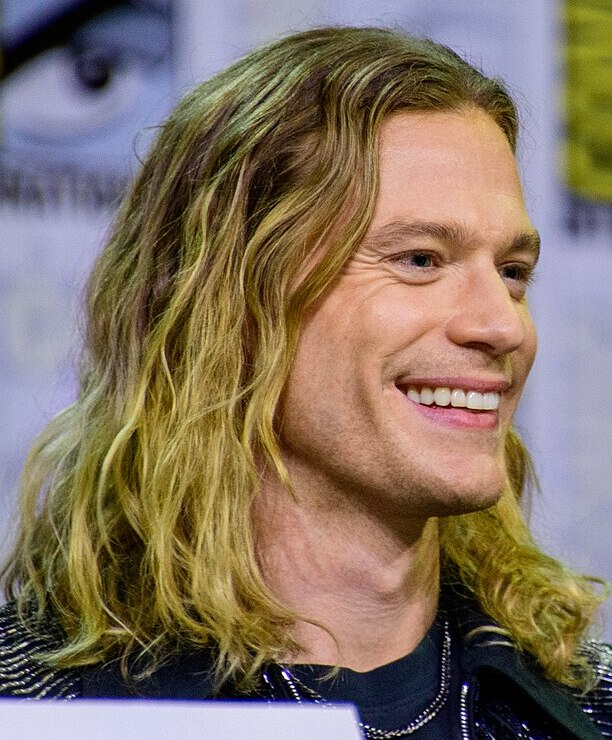
The performances of Jacob Anderson and Sam Reid as Louis de Pointe du Lac and Lestat de Lioncourt, respectively, garnered critical acclaim.

The episode was met with critical acclaim. On the review aggregator Rotten Tomatoes, it holds an approval rating of 100% based on five reviews, with an average rating of 8.8/10. Tony Sokol of Den of Geek gave the episode a rating of 5 out of 5 stars and said, "'In Throes of Increasing Wonder' is a fully satisfying introductory course, serving up preface as first chapter. [...] [It] is a hunt, and at the end, viewers will be trapped. It opens a whole new vein." Sokol also praised the production design, tone, characterization, and performances of Anderson and Reid. Kathleen Walsh of Vulture gave it 4 out of 5 stars and praised its writing, premise, and the whole sequence at the church. From Greg Wheeler of The Review Geek, it also received 4 out of 5 stars. In his review, Wheeler wrote, "Interview With The Vampire gets off to a good start, with some beautiful cinematography, gorgeous characterization and a smart premise." Whitney Evans of TV Fanatic gave it a score of 4.8 out of 5 and lauded the performances of Anderson and Reid. Sean T. Collins of Decider, called it a "marvelously melodramatic production" and praised Jones' writing, Taylor's directing, Hart's score, the costumes, set design, and Anderson's and Reid's performances. In his review of the first season, Daniel Fienberg of The Hollywood Reporter praised Jones' writing and Taylor's directing in the episode, especially for making sense of the relationship between Louis and Lestat and "[letting them] embrace their queer identities."

The episode was listed by several publications as one of the best television episodes of 2022. /Film ranked it as the tenth best TV episode of the year and wrote, "'In Throes of Increasing Wonder...' is the dazzling, Alan Taylor-directed first outing that seamlessly melds Rice's existing story with new updates, and introduces a firecracker cast led by Jacob Anderson's brooding Louis, Eric Bogosian's deadpan reporter Daniel, and the wild-eyed, delightfully malevolent vampire Lestat, embodied perfectly by Sam Reid. [...] [It] is a variety pack of indelibly dark and entertaining moments. [...] [It] also grounds the story in genuine emotion, revealing the unique strain Louis faces as a Black businessman in 1910 New Orleans." Meanwhile, Primetimer included it in its unraked list of "Best TV Episodes of 2022". Syfy Wire listed the episode as one of the "best sci-fi and horror TV episodes of 2022" and said that it was "smart, richly produced, and perfectly acted" and that it "[gave us] a fresh take and an updating of Rice's book and mythology that honors her world but also in some ways makes it better." In addition, TV Guide included it in its "6 Shows and Episodes That Blew Up the Group Chat in 2022" list.
