= Is My Very Nature That of a Devil =

- Interview with the Vampire episode
- Episode no.: Season 1 Episode 3
- Directed by: Keith Powell
- Written by: Rolin Jones; Hannah Moscovitch
- Cinematography by: Jesse M. Feldman
- Editing by: Janet Weinberg
- Original air date: October 16, 2022
- Running time: 46 minutes

Guest appearances
- Kalyne Coleman as Grace de Pointe du Lac; Assad Zaman as Rashid; John DiMaggio as Alderman Fenwick; Chris Stack as Thomas "Tom" Anderson; Rae Dawn Chong Florence de Pointe du Lac; Jeff Pope as Finn O'Shea; Dana Gourrier as Bricktop Williams; Christian Robinson as Levi; Maura Grace Athari as Antoinette; Thomas Antony Olajide as Jonah

Episode chronology
| ← Previous "...After the Phantoms of Your Former Self" | Next → "...The Ruthless Pursuit of Blood with All a Child's Demanding" |

"Is My Very Nature That of a Devil" is the third episode of the first season of the American gothic horror television series Interview with the Vampire, an adaptation of Anne Rice's novel of the same name. Written by series creator and showrunner Rolin Jones and writer Hannah Moscovitch, and directed by Keith Powell, the episode first aired on October 16, 2022, on AMC.

"Is My Very Nature That of a Devil" marks the first appearance of Claudia (Bailey Bass). In the United States, the episode garnered a viewership of 0.45 million during its premiere night on linear television alone. It received highly positive reviews from critics, with praise for the writing, character development, cinematography, production value, and performances of Anderson and Reid. Cinematographer Jesse M. Feldman received an ASC Award nomination for his work in the episode.

== Plot ==
Louis (Jacob Anderson) proposes that he and Lestat (Sam Reid) only prey on the morally corrupt. Lestat participates in the experiment but Louis still struggles with guilt and instead resorts to feeding only on animals. Louis feels threatened when Lestat takes a blues singer, Antoinette (Maura Grace Athari), as a lover, prompting Louis to have sex with Jonah (Thomas Antony Olajide), a childhood friend in town on Army leave. When Louis attempts to visit his family, his mother Florence (Rae Dawn Chong) rejects him.

Meanwhile, Alderman Fenwick (John DiMaggio) and other white elites plot to reclaim Storyville properties from Black business owners like Louis. After Fenwick threatens and insults Louis, Louis kills him and hangs his mutilated corpse in public. In retaliation, the white mob attacks, burning down businesses and homes. Amid the chaos, Louis hears the thoughts of a frightened young girl trapped in a burning building and rescues her.

In the present timeline, Daniel Molloy (Eric Bogosian) continues interviewing Louis in his Dubai apartment. Their conversations grow more tense as Daniel begins to question the accuracy and consistency of Louis's memories. He challenges Louis about the omissions and contradictions in his retelling, especially around his relationship with Lestat and the nature of certain violent acts.

== Production ==
=== Development ===
On May 13, 2020, AMC Networks announced that it had acquired the rights to Anne Rice's The Vampire Chronicles and Lives of the Mayfair Witches, comprising 18 novels. On June 24, 2021, AMC gave a series order, based on Interview with the Vampire, the first novel in The Vampire Chronicles, with a planned premiere in 2022. Rolin Jones was announced to serve as writer, executive producer, and showrunner. Mark Johnson, Rice and her son Christopher were also named executive producers.

=== Writing ===
"Is My Very Nature That of a Devil" was written by series creator and showrunner Rolin Jones and Hannah Moscovitch.

=== Casting ===
The episode stars Jacob Anderson as Louis de Pointe du Lac, Sam Reid as Lestat de Lioncourt, Bailey Bass as Claudia, and Eric Bogosian as Daniel Molloy. The recurring cast includes Kalyne Coleman as Louis' sister Grace and Assad Zaman as Rashid.

The casting of Bass was announced on October 5, 2021. The series' version of Claudia differs from the novel series in terms of race and age. While she was originally depicted as white and five years old, the series reimagines her as mixed race and 14 years old. Despite these changes, her character remains essentially true to the source material.

=== Filming ===
The episode was directed by Keith Powell, while Jesse M. Feldman worked as the cinematographer. The first season's principal photography took place in New Orleans and lasted from November 8, 2021, to May 18, 2022.

== Release ==
"Is My Very Nature That of a Devil" aired on AMC, on October 16, 2022, but was released a week earlier on the network's streaming service AMC+.

== Reception ==
=== Ratings ===
On linear television, an estimated 0.445 million viewers watched "Is My Very Nature That of a Devil" during its first broadcast on AMC, with a 0.09 ratings share. This was a decrease from the previous episode, which was watched by 0.525 million viewers, but with the same ratings share.

=== Critical reception ===
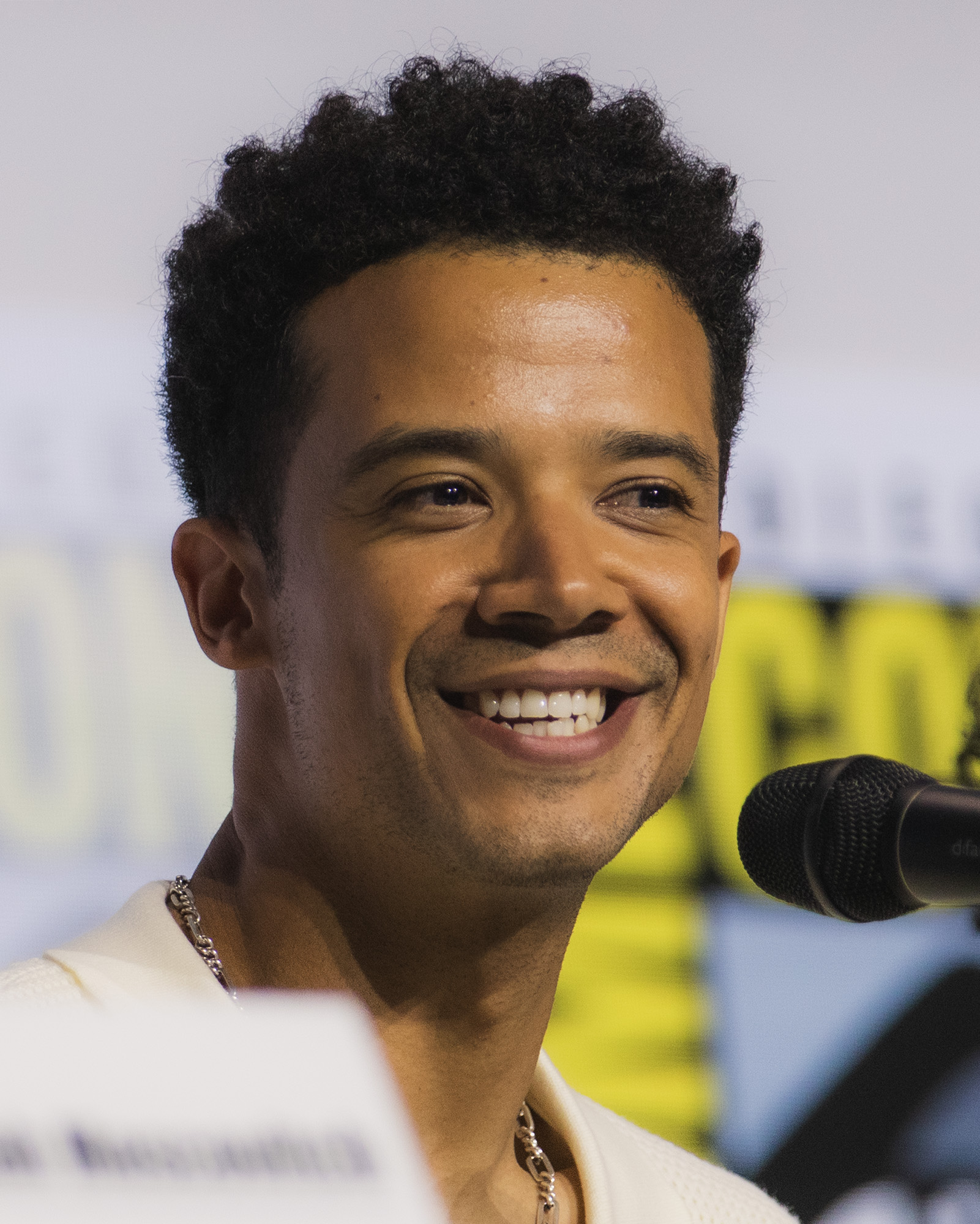
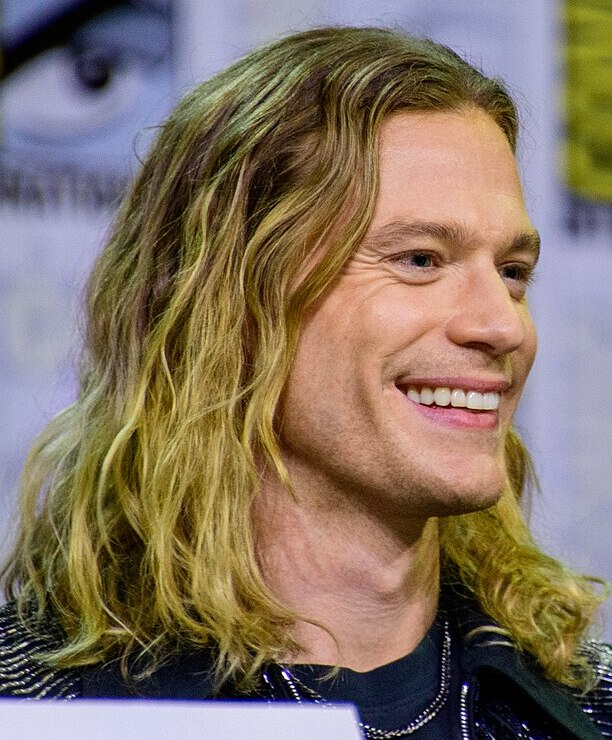
Jacob Anderson (left) and Sam Reid (right) received critical acclaim for their performances in the episode.

The episode was met with highly positive critical reviews. On the review aggregator Rotten Tomatoes, it holds an approval rating of 100% based on five reviews, with an average rating of 7.9/10.

Tony Sokol of Den of Geek awarded the episode 5 out of 5 stars, praising the series for consistently maintaining high quality in production value, cinematic scope, character development, suspense, romance, and moral exploration. He wrote, "'Is My Very Nature That of a Devil' breaks rules and liberates the series to mix Jones' vision with Rice's story. It feels both revelatory and revolutionary, musical in its language, and eloquently instrumental. It is a high point in a series that has been building steadily and suspensefully." Sokol also commended the performances of Anderson and Reid. Sean T. Collins of Decider echoed this sentiment, lauding the writing, character development, and performances of Anderson and Reid. He remarked, "[The two] remain absolutely terrific as Louis and Lestat, the former rough around the edges but morally sensitive, the latter aesthetically refined but a brute at heart, using that refinement to justify that brutality." The episode also received strong ratings from other critics: 4.5 out of 5 stars from Ashley Bissette Sumerel of Tell-Tale TV, 4.3 out of 5 stars from Whitney Evans of TV Fanatic, 3.5 out of 5 stars from Greg Wheeler of The Review Geek, and 3 out of 5 stars from Kathleen Walsh of Vulture.

=== Accolades ===
At the 37th American Society of Cinematographers Awards, Feldman was nominated for Outstanding Achievement in Cinematography in an Episode of a One-Hour Series for Commercial Television. Meanwhile, at the 2023 HPA Awards, the episode received a nomination for Outstanding Supporting Visual Effects – Episode or Series Season.
