= ...After the Phantoms of Your Former Self =

- Interview with the Vampire episode
- Episode no.: Season 1 Episode 2
- Directed by: Alan Taylor
- Written by: Jonathan Ceniceroz; Dave Harris
- Cinematography by: David Tattersall
- Editing by: Yuka Shirasuna
- Original air date: October 9, 2022
- Running time: 52 minutes

Guest appearances
- Kalyne Coleman as Grace de Pointe du Lac; Assad Zaman as Rashid; John DiMaggio as Alderman Fenwick; Chris Stack as Thomas "Tom" Anderson; Rae Dawn Chong Florence de Pointe du Lac; Jeff Pope as Finn O'Shea; Dana Gourrier as Bricktop Williams; Christian Robinson as Levi

Episode chronology
← Previous "In Throes of Increasing Wonder..."	Next → "Is My Very Nature That of a Devil"

"...After the Phantoms of Your Former Self" is the second episode of the first season of the American gothic horror television series Interview with the Vampire, an adaptation of Anne Rice's novel of the same name. Written by Jonathan Ceniceroz and Dave Harris and directed by executive producer Alan Taylor, the episode first aired on October 9, 2022, on AMC.

The plot follows Daniel Molloy's second interview session with vampire Louis de Pointe du Lac. Louis' life story as a vampire continues directly after the end of the previous episode as he tries to adapt to his new existence as a vampire and to learn how to use the vampire ability to read people's minds.

In the United States, the episode garnered a viewership of 0.5 million during its premiere night on linear television alone. It received critical acclaim for its direction, writing, cinematography, humor, and the performances of Anderson and Reid.

== Plot ==
In the present, Louis (Jacob Anderson) and Molloy (Eric Bogosian) begin the second session of their interview while having dinner together. During dinner, Louis confesses that he no longer preys on people and that his last victim was in 2000.

Louis' story continues with Lestat (Sam Reid) disposing of the priests he killed in the previous episode in the church graveyard. Louis follows him while stumbling around as his transformation into a vampire is progressing. Louis then notices drops of blood on the ground from one of the corpses and tries to taste it but is stopped by Lestat, who explains that drinking blood from a dead body can kill vampires.

Lestat then helps Louis find his first prey at a bar - they identify a man whom they later bring to Lestat's house. There, Louis devours the man while Lestat teaches him the right way to suck the blood through the neck. Afterwards, Louis is overwhelmed with guilt, so he decides to go home. On the way, the sunlight shines on him and burns his skin. In pain, he runs back to Lestat's house. Lestat then shows Louis his bedroom and invites Louis to sleep on top of him in his coffin.

The following night, Lestat teaches Louis to listen to people's heartbeats and thoughts. Louis asks Lestat to read his mind and Lestat replies that he can no longer do it as it is part of the sacrifice after turning him into a vampire. They then visit Du Lac's family home where Louis reunites with his mother (Rae Dawn Chong) and sister, Grace (Kalyne Coleman). He practises his abilities on them and, while hugging Grace, he feels two other heartbeats, sensing that she is pregnant, and tells her that she is carrying twins. Later, it is shown that Louis now has his own coffin. Before sleep, Louis tells Lestat that he wants to buy the Fair Play Saloon and asks Lestat to support him, to which he agrees.

Five years later Louis, who has been away from his family since his last visit, pays them a visit and learns that, in addition to the twins, Grace has given birth to another baby. When Grace leaves the room to care for her other children, she asks Louis to hold the baby. Louis is almost overwhelmed by the desire to eat the baby but instead forces himself to leave the baby on the floor and go home without saying goodbye. At Lestat's house, Louis tells him about the guilt and shame he felt for nearly eating his own nephew.

Later, the two go out to see an opera but Lestat is unimpressed by the lead tenor's performance. After, Lestat talks to the tenor and invites him to his house. Lestat then kills him while Louis watches in horror. However, Louis eventually joins Lestat in drinking their victim's blood.

== Production ==
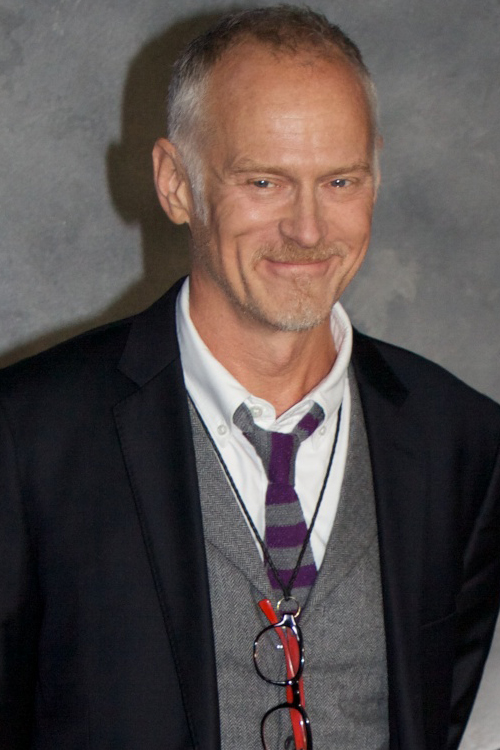
Executive producer Alan Taylor directed the episode.

=== Development and filming ===
On May 13, 2020, AMC Networks announced that it had acquired the rights to Anne Rice's The Vampire Chronicles and Lives of the Mayfair Witches, comprising 18 novels. On June 24, 2021, AMC gave a series order for an eight-episode first season based on Interview with the Vampire, the first novel in The Vampire Chronicles, with a planned premiere in 2022. Rolin Jones was announced to serve as writer, executive producer, and showrunner. Mark Johnson, Rice and her son Christopher were also named executive producers.

On July 19, 2021, Alan Taylor was confirmed to serve as an executive producer and to direct the first two episodes. David Tattersall worked as the cinematographer of the episode. The first season's principal photography took place in New Orleans, from November 8, 2021, until May 18, 2022.

=== Writing ===
"...After the Phantoms of Your Former Self" was written by Jonathan Ceniceroz and Dave Harris.

=== Casting ===
The episode stars Jacob Anderson as Louis de Pointe du Lac, Sam Reid as Lestat de Lioncourt, and Eric Bogosian as Daniel Molloy. The recurring cast includes Kalyne Coleman as Louis' sister Grace and Assad Zaman as Rashid.

== Release ==
"...After the Phantoms of Your Former Self" aired on AMC, on October 9, 2022, but was released a week earlier on the network's streaming service AMC+.

== Reception ==
=== Ratings ===
On linear television, an estimated 0.525 million viewers watched "...After the Phantoms of Your Former Self" during its first broadcast on AMC, with a 0.09 ratings share. This was a decrease from the previous episode, which was watched by 0.622 million viewers with a 0.15 ratings share.

=== Critical reception ===
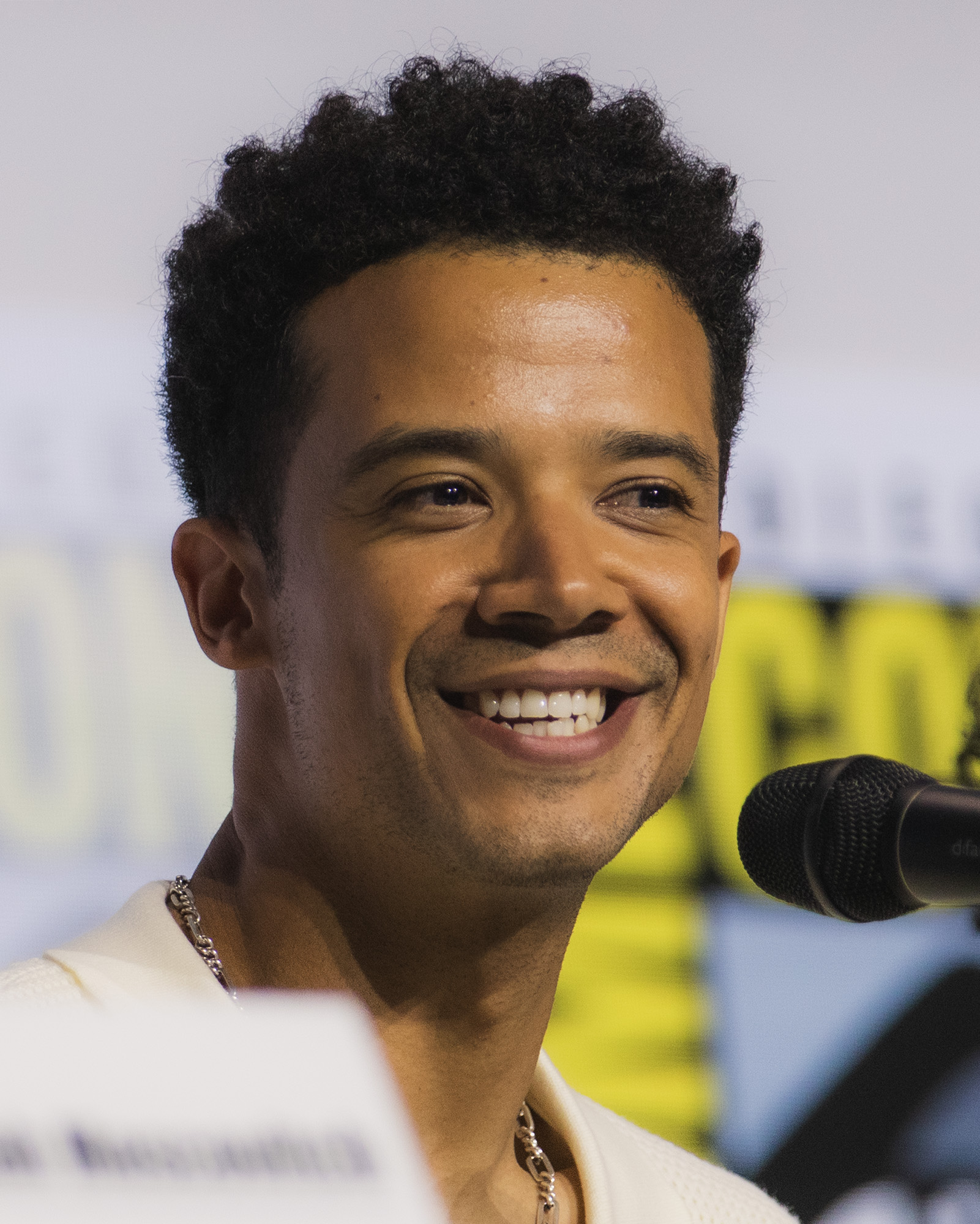
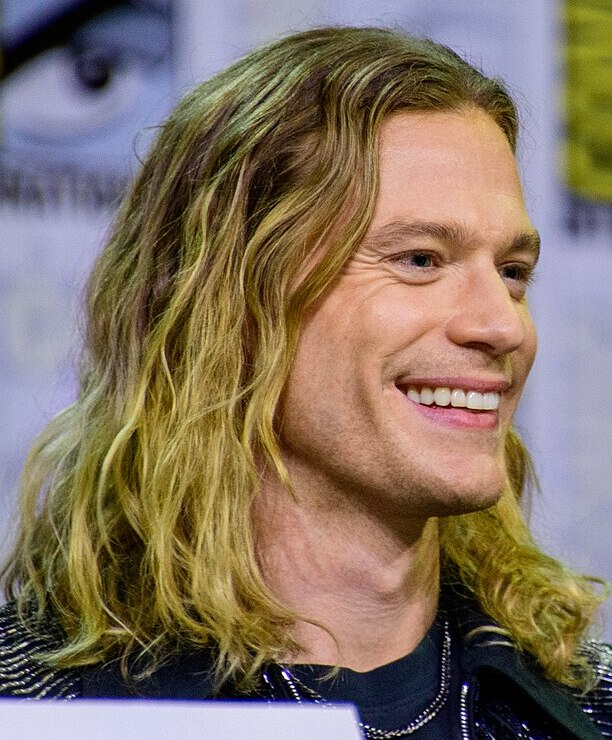
The performances of Jacob Anderson (left) and Sam Reid (right) in the episode received critical acclaim.

The episode was met with critical acclaim. On the review aggregator Rotten Tomatoes, it holds an approval rating of 100% based on six reviews, with an average rating of 8.8/10.

It received a rating of 5 out of 5 stars from Tony Sokol of Den of Geek, who praised the performances of Anderson and Reid; 4.7 out of 5 stars from Ashley Bissette Sumerel of Tell-Tale TV, writing that, "'After the Phantoms of Your Former Self' is even more breathtaking than the first episode. It continues to capture the spirit of Anne Rice's works in a way that's thought-provoking and timely. [...] The series continues to be so much better than I could have hoped for, and it has me falling in love with Anne Rice's works in a whole new way"; 4.5 out of 5 stars from Whitney Evans of TV Fanatic, who singled out the cinematography and performances of Anderson and Reid as the highlights of the episode, and wrote, "It's safe to say the first episode wasn't a fluke, as the second installment is excellent"; 4 out of 5 stars from Kathleen Walsh of Vulture; and 3 out of 5 stars from Greg Wheeler of The Review Geek, who noted the episode's "slower" pace, in comparison to the first, and how it "[did not have] much in the way of plot progression". Nonetheless, he still appreciated it as it "sets things up for a much more dramatic chapter to come next week".

Concluding his review, Sean T. Collins of Decider said, "This is heady, funny, nasty, sexy, cutting, opulent stuff — again, exactly what you'd want from an Anne Rice adaptation and more. While it often takes itself deadly seriously, as the melodramatic material demands, it's also shot through with that strain of actually funny comedy, letting just a little bit of daylight in to enhance the shadows. An extraordinary balancing act and, I think, an extraordinary show." Collins also praised the writing and directing work of the episode. Sara Netzley of Entertainment Weekly wrote, "Dare I say this episode was even better than the pilot? We get more layers of Lestat tonight, more of his humor and savagery, and Jacob Anderson's range continues to be extraordinary." In addition, several critics pointed out the humor as one of the episode's highlights.
