= ...The Ruthless Pursuit of Blood with All a Child's Demanding =

- Interview with the Vampire episode
- Episode no.: Season 1 Episode 4
- Directed by: Keith Powell
- Written by: Eleanor Burgess
- Cinematography by: Jesse M. Feldman
- Editing by: Victor Du Bois
- Original air date: October 23, 2022
- Running time: 46 minutes

Guest appearances
- Kalyne Coleman as Grace de Pointe du Lac; Assad Zaman as Rashid; Rae Dawn Chong Florence de Pointe du Lac; Christian Robinson as Levi; Brian Anthony Wilson as Mortician

Episode chronology
← Previous "Is My Very Nature That of a Devil"	Next → "A Vile Hunger for Your Hammering Heart"

"...The Ruthless Pursuit of Blood with All a Child's Demanding" is the fourth episode of the first season of the American gothic horror television series Interview with the Vampire, an adaptation of Anne Rice's novel of the same name. Written by Eleanor Burgess and directed by Keith Powell, the episode first aired on September 23, 2022, on AMC.

In the United States, the episode drew approximately 0.47 million viewers on its premiere night via linear television. It received critical acclaim, with particular praise for its direction, writing, tone, character development, the introduction of Claudia, and Bailey Bass' performance.

== Plot ==
In the present, Daniel (Eric Bogosian) reads Claudia's (Bailey Bass) diaries. She is saved from the fire by Louis (Jacob Anderson), but she is horribly burned. To save her from death, Louis convinces a reluctant Lestat (Sam Reid) to turn her into a vampire. Claudia receives a crash course in vampirism and makes her first kill, but she proves to be impulsive and excessive in her feeding, eating more than Louis or Lestat while being less cautious. But she becomes an integral part of the household, acting as a daughter to Louis and Lestat.

As vampires' thoughts cannot be read by the one who made them, Louis and Claudia have a special connection apart from Lestat, although Claudia also expresses a fondness for Lestat when it comes to vampiric activities. When Louis's mother Florence (Rae Dawn Chong) dies, his sister Grace (Kalyne Coleman) approaches him to buy their family home, expressing fear of what he has become. Louis reluctantly agrees.

Over time, Claudia becomes frustrated to be an adult in the body of a teenager and acts out. She soon falls in love with a young man, but during an intimate moment, she loses control and kills him. Lestat responds coldly by making her watch the young man's body burn.

== Production ==
=== Development ===
On May 13, 2020, AMC Networks announced that it had acquired the rights to Anne Rice's The Vampire Chronicles and Lives of the Mayfair Witches, comprising 18 novels. On June 24, 2021, AMC gave a series order, based on Interview with the Vampire, the first novel in The Vampire Chronicles, with a planned premiere in 2022. Rolin Jones was announced to serve as writer, executive producer, and showrunner. Mark Johnson, Rice and her son Christopher were also named executive producers.

=== Writing and filming ===
"...The Ruthless Pursuit of Blood with All a Child's Demanding" was written by Eleanor Burgess and directed by Keith Powell. The first season's principal photography took place in New Orleans and lasted from November 8, 2021, to May 18, 2022.

=== Casting ===
The episode stars Jacob Anderson as Louis de Pointe du Lac, Sam Reid as Lestat de Lioncourt, Bailey Bassas Claudia, and Eric Bogosian as Daniel Molloy. The recurring cast includes Kalyne Coleman as Louis' sister Grace and Assad Zaman as Rashid.

== Release ==
"...The Ruthless Pursuit of Blood with All a Child's Demanding" aired on AMC, on October 23, 2022, but was released a week earlier on the network's streaming service AMC+.

== Reception ==
=== Ratings ===
On linear television, an estimated 0.469 million viewers watched "...The Ruthless Pursuit of Blood with All a Child's Demanding" during its first broadcast on AMC, with a 0.10 ratings share. This was an increase from the previous episode, which was watched by 0.445 million viewers, with a 0.09 ratings share.

=== Critical reception ===
The episode was met with critical acclaim. On the review aggregator Rotten Tomatoes, it holds an approval rating of 100% based on five reviews, with an average rating of 8.1/10.

Tony Sokol of Den of Geek rated the episode with 4.5 out of 5 stars and wrote, "Anne Rice's greatest creation is recreated, and not in the original image, but Interview with the Vampire makes no apologies. Cauterize the wound and move on, vampires move only forward. 'The Ruthless Pursuit of Blood with All a Child's Demanding,' as distressing as it will be to longtime fans, will still shock viewers as horror should." He also singled out Bass' performance as Claudia as the episode's highlight. In another positive review, Kathleen Walsh of Vulture gave it 4 out of 5 stars, praising the episode for its narrative shift and the introduction of Claudia, describing her as "an absolute delight". Walsh noted that the change in perspective, told through Claudia's diaries, offers a refreshing and compelling viewpoint that enriched the series' dynamic. She also highlighted Claudia's energetic embrace of vampirism and the new dynamic she brings to the vampire household.

Greg Wheeler of The Review Geek also praised the episode for its effective shift in perspective to Claudia, noting that it offers valuable insight into her experience as a young vampire. He described the episode as a compelling coming-of-age allegory, highlighting Claudia's struggles with control and the dysfunctional family dynamic she forms with Louis and Lestat. Wheeler also appreciated the fresh narrative angle, stating that the change in viewpoint added depth and a new dimension to the series. Whitney Evans of TV Fanatic rated the episode 4.2 out of 5 and wrote, "This hour is mainly about Claudia and walking through those years beside her, but Louis and Lestat's relationship is always simmering in the background, and this time we get to see it through someone else's eyes."

Sean T. Collins of Decider wrote, "With thrilling, throw-caution-to-the-wind speed and a gobsmacking willingness to shift its tone backwards and forwards at will, this week's episode introduces the character of Claudia. [...] As played by an absolutely marvelous Bailey Bass, Claudia is an explosive, and more than a little obnoxious, ball of energy." Collins also commended the series' "ability to balance the thrills and chills and sex and blood and comedy of an over-the-top Gothic vampire romance with serious observations about race, wealth, addiction, unhappy relationships, and now de facto child abuse and the misery of teenagers."

Entertainment Weekly included the episode in its unranked year-end list of "33 best TV episodes of 2022".
