= Interview with the Vampire (TV series) =

2022 American gothic horror television series

- Title card for the first season
- Also known as: Anne Rice's The Vampire Lestat (season 3); Anne Rice's Queen of the Damned (season 4)
- Genre: Gothic horror; Gothic romance; Southern Gothic; Vampire drama; Dark fantasy
- Created by: Rolin Jones
- Based on: The Vampire Chronicles by Anne Rice
- Showrunner: Rolin Jones
- Starring: Jacob Anderson; Sam Reid; Eric Bogosian; Bailey Bass; Assad Zaman; Delainey Hayles; Ben Daniels; Joseph Potter; Jennifer Ehle
- Opening theme: "Interview with the Orchestra" (seasons 1-2); "All Fall Down" (season 3)
- Composer: Daniel Hart
- Country of origin: United States
- Original languages: English; French
- No. of seasons: 3
- No. of episodes: 22

Production
- Executive producers: Rolin Jones; Mark Johnson; Alan Taylor (season 1); Anne Rice; Christopher Rice; Mark Taylor (season 2); Craig Zisk (season 3); Hannah Moscovitch (season 3)
- Producers: Jessica Held; Adam O'Byrne; Tom Williams; Kevin Lafferty (season 3)
- Production locations: United States; Czech Republic (season 2); Canada (season 3)
- Cinematography: David Tattersall; Jesse M. Feldman; Stuart Howell; Earle Dresner
- Running time: 46–71 minutes
- Production companies: Gran Via Productions; Dwight Street Book Club; AMC Studios

Original release
- Network: AMC
- Release: October 2, 2022 – present

Related
- Immortal Universe

Anne Rice's Interview with the Vampire, or simply Interview with the Vampire, is an American gothic horror television series created by Rolin Jones for AMC, based on The Vampire Chronicles by Anne Rice, named after the first book. Starring Jacob Anderson as Louis de Pointe du Lac and Sam Reid as Lestat de Lioncourt, it portrays the vampire Louis's recount of his past and tumultuous relationship with the vampire Lestat, as well as the fallout of its unauthorized publication.

The series embraces the queer elements of Rice's work, which are only insinuated in the 1994 film adaptation, and deals with themes such as subjectivity, race, and abuse. It is the first series set in the Immortal Universe, a shared universe based on Rice's novels. A series order was made in June 2021, after AMC Networks purchased the rights to intellectual property encompassing 18 of Rice's novels in 2020.

The series premiered on October 2, 2022, with the first two seasons covering the events of the novel. The series returned for a third season on June 7, 2026, titled Anne Rice's The Vampire Lestat, based on the second novel. The series has been renewed for a fourth season titled Anne Rice's Queen of the Damned, based on the third novel. Reception has been positive, with praise for its writing, costumes, soundtrack, production design, lead performances and their chemistry; it has received nominations at the Critics' Choice Television Awards and GLAAD Media Awards among others.

== Cast and characters ==
=== Main ===
- Jacob Anderson as Louis de Pointe du Lac / Thomas Pitt, a 145-year-old vampire who summons Daniel Molloy to redo their unpublished interview of 49 years earlier. In 1910, Louis is a 33-year-old closeted Creole man and successful brothel owner in New Orleans. He is haunted by guilt and seethes at the racism directed at him. In the present day, he uses the alias Thomas Pitt as a business magnate.
- Sam Reid as Lestat de Lioncourt, a 265-year-old hedonistic French vampire who falls in love with Louis upon his arrival in New Orleans. He later turns Louis into a vampire but is irritated by Louis's preoccupation with humans. His background of abuse at the hands of his family and maker makes him fearful of abandonment. Lestat forms the rock band The Vampire Lestat as a response to the publication of Daniel's book. Reid also portrays Lestat's body double, Jarda Klapek, in the third season.
- Eric Bogosian as Daniel Molloy, a cynical journalist in his 70s with Parkinson's disease and a long history of drug and alcohol abuse whose interview with Louis in 1973 ends with him being attacked. He later publishes his second interview with Louis as the book Interview with the Vampire without Louis's consent and is made a vampire by Armand.
- Bailey Bass (season 1) and Delainey Hayles (season 2–present) as Claudia, a 14-year-old girl whom Lestat turns into a vampire at Louis's insistence to save her life. She forms a daughter-father relationship with the pair and struggles with her fate as an eternal teenager. Hayles also plays Regina, a waitress with a strong resemblance to Claudia, in the third season.
- Assad Zaman as Armand, (Note: Zaman is promoted to the main cast from the final episode of season 1.) a 514-year-old vampire who is Louis's current turned former lover, who saves Daniel's life during the first interview. In the 1940s, he is the leader of the vampiric troupe the Théâtre des Vampires. Armand first appears under the guise of Rashid, Louis's dutiful servant.
- Ben Daniels as Santiago (season 2), the leading thespian of the Théâtre des Vampires, who is increasingly suspicious of Louis and Claudia. He believes Armand is an inadequate leader.
- Joseph Potter as Nicolas de Lenfent (season 3; guest season 2), Lestat's former friend, lover, and fledgling.
- Jennifer Ehle as Gabriella de Lioncourt (née Vece) (season 3), Lestat's mother and fledgling, who comes back into his life after he becomes a rock star.

=== Recurring ===
- Kalyne Coleman as Grace de Pointe du Lac Freniere (season 1), Louis's newly married sister
- John DiMaggio as Alderman Fenwick (season 1), a racist businessman looking to take advantage of Louis
- Chris Stack as Thomas "Tom" Anderson (season 1), the owner of the Fair Play Saloon, an upscale brothel
- Rae Dawn Chong as Florence de Pointe du Lac (season 1), Louis's widowed mother
- Jeff Pope as Finn O'Shea (season 1), one of Louis's enforcers
- Dana Gourrier as Bricktop Williams (season 1), a prostitute who works for Louis
- Christian Robinson as Levi Freniere (season 1), Grace's new husband and Louis and Paul's brother-in-law
- Maura Grace Athari as Antoinette Brown (season 1, guest season 3), a blues singer who becomes romantically involved with Lestat
- Bally Gill as Rashid (season 2, guest season 3), Louis and Armand's servant, later revealed to be a Talamasca agent
- Suzanne Andrade as Celeste (season 2), one of Théâtre des Vampires' thespians
- Esme Appleton as Estelle (season 2), one of Théâtre des Vampires' thespians
- Jake Cecil as Gustave (season 2), one of Théâtre des Vampires' thespians
- Roxane Duran as Madeleine Éparvier (season 2), a dressmaker who becomes Louis's fledgling and Claudia's immortal companion
- Christopher Geary as Samuel "Sam" Barclay (season 2–3), Théâtre des Vampires' playwright-in-residence, who works as a DJ present-day and also secretly works with the Talamasca
- Khetphet "KP" Phagnasay as Quang Pham (season 2), Théâtre des Vampires' projectionist and swing actor
- Yung Nguyen as Tuan Pham (season 2), Théâtre des Vampires' projectionist, swing actor, and Quang's biological father
- Justin Kirk as Raglan James (season 3, guest season 2), a member of the Talamasca
- Jeanine Serralles as Christine Claire (season 3), Lestat's lawyer
- Gopal Divan as Dr. Fareed Bhansali (season 3, guest season 1), Louis's personal physician whom Lestat steals
- Noah Reid as Larry (season 3), The Vampire Lestat's guitarist
- Ryan Kattner as Salamander (season 3), The Vampire Lestat's bassist
- Seamus Patterson as Alex (season 3), The Vampire Lestat's guitarist and Larry's brother
- Sarah Swire as TC (season 3), The Vampire Lestat's drummer
- Christopher Heyerdahl as Marius de Romanus (season 3), Armand's maker
- Amaka Umeh as Dee Pharma (season 3), a member of Lestat's entourage
- Damien Atkins as Magnus (season 3), Lestat's maker
- Shepherd Munroe as child Lestat de Lioncourt (season 3)

=== Notable guest stars ===
- Steven G. Norfleet as Paul de Pointe du Lac (seasons 1 and 3), Louis's troubled brother
- Damon Daunno as Bruce; later renamed Killer (seasons 1 and 3), a lone vampire Claudia meets during her travels
- Luke Brandon Field as young Daniel Molloy (seasons 1–2)
- Blake Ritson as Morgan Ward (season 2), an English refugee Louis and Claudia meet in Romania
- Stephanie Heyes as Emilia (season 2), a Romanian refugee, Morgan's partner
- Gabriel Frielich as Felix (season 2), a fledgling vampire and rat-catcher for Lestat
- David Costabile as Leonard (season 2), a TV personality who interviews Daniel
- Sheila Atim as Akasha (season 3), "the Queen of the Damned", progenitor of all vampires
- Ella Ballentine as Baby Jenks (season 3), a drugged fan Lestat drinks on stage and Bruce's fiancée
- Gage Munroe as young adult Lestat de Lioncourt (season 3)
- Sarah Afful as Merrick Mayfair (season 3), a New Orleans-based witch Lestat commissioned to summon Claudia's spirit

== Episodes ==
=== Series overview ===
Season	Show Title	Season Title	Episodes	Originally released	
Season	Show Title	Season Title	Episodes	First released	Last released
1	Interview with the Vampire	Part I	7	October 2, 2022	November 13, 2022
2	Interview with the Vampire	Part II	8	May 12, 2024	June 30, 2024
3	The Vampire Lestat	—N/a	7	June 7, 2026	July 19, 2026
4	Queen of the Damned	—N/a	TBA	TBA	TBA

=== Season 1: Interview with the Vampire – Part I (2022) ===
No. overall	No. in season	Title	Directed by	Written by	Original release date	U.S. viewers (millions)
1	1	"In Throes of Increasing Wonder..."	Alan Taylor	Rolin Jones	October 2, 2022	0.622
In 2022 Dubai, immortal vampire Louis de Pointe du Lac begins retelling his life story to journalist Daniel Molloy. In 1910, successful New Orleans brothel owner Louis is befriended by the mysterious and handsome Frenchman, Lestat de Lioncourt. Louis, burdened by his troubled younger brother Paul's disapproval and the limitations put upon him as a black man, struggles with his increasing attraction to the flamboyant and rakish Lestat. When Louis and Lestat finally consummate their relationship, Louis is overcome by the intense feelings brought upon by Lestat's "little drink" of his blood and vows never to see Lestat again. Paul jumps off the roof to his death, and a devastated Louis is tortured by his mother's blame and Lestat's persistent advances. He recounts his many sins in a church confessional, but Lestat arrives and slaughters the priests. Lestat offers Louis an escape from the troubles of his mortal life, and with Louis's agreement, Lestat makes him a vampire.
2	2	"...After the Phantoms of Your Former Self"	Alan Taylor	Jonathan Ceniceroz & Dave Harris	October 9, 2022	0.525
Lestat begins teaching Louis how to hunt for prey and use his new vampiric powers, but though he is eager to feed, Louis is not the remorseless killer his mentor is. Six years later, Louis and Lestat have purchased the Fair Play Saloon and rechristened it as Azalea Hall, but Louis still struggles with his new life. After a long overdue visit home, the temptation to drink the blood of his infant nephew painfully reminds Louis that he is no longer human. Still, he cannot fully embrace the casual cruelty and disregard for human life while Lestat toys with a dying tenor opera singer in front of him.
3	3	"Is My Very Nature That of a Devil"	Keith Powell	Rolin Jones & Hannah Moscovitch	October 16, 2022	0.445
Louis proposes that he and Lestat only prey on the worst of humankind. Lestat participates in the experiment, but Louis still has qualms that drive him to feed off animals instead. Louis feels threatened when Lestat takes a blues singer, Antoinette, as a lover, so Louis has sex with Jonah, a childhood friend in town on leave. Louis finds that he is unwelcome at his family's home, as his mother Florence sees what he is. Alderman Fenwick targets Azalea Hall as part of a push by white business owners to force Louis and other black owners out of Storyville and take over their properties. This is the last straw for Louis, who murders Fenwick and hangs his mutilated corpse in public. The white citizens retaliate with fire and destruction. A despondent Louis hears the thoughts of a young girl in a burning boarding house and rushes in to save her.
4	4	"...The Ruthless Pursuit of Blood with All a Child's Demanding"	Keith Powell	Eleanor Burgess	October 23, 2022	0.469
In the present, Daniel reads Claudia's diaries. She is saved from the fire by Louis, but she is horribly burned. Louis convinces Lestat to make her a vampire rather than let her die. Claudia receives a crash course in vampirism and makes her first kill, but she proves to be impulsive, eating more than Louis or Lestat while being less cautious. But she proves to be a good addition to their household, acting as a daughter to the older vampires. As vampires' thoughts cannot be read by the one who made them, Louis and Claudia have a special connection apart from Lestat, although Claudia also expresses a fondness for Lestat when it comes to vampiric activities. Louis's mother dies, and his sister Grace wants to buy their family home from Louis, having grown fearful of him. Louis begrudgingly agrees to have the papers drawn up. After witnessing a couple making love during one hunt, Claudia becomes frustrated to be an adult in the body of a teenager and acts out. She falls in love with a man named Charlie, but in her excitement, she accidentally kills him. Lestat makes her watch Charlie's body burn.
5	5	"A Vile Hunger for Your Hammering Heart"	Levan Akin	Hannah Moscovitch	October 30, 2022	0.465
Louis and Lestat learn that Claudia has secretly been on a mass murder spree and has carelessly dumped the bodies in an area just below the river level. A big storm comes in, and a multitude of corpses wash up. The police come to the townhouse for a routine search and nearly discover the human parts Claudia has been collecting in her room. Lamenting that Lestat and Louis have each other to love, Claudia admits she has tried to make other vampires to have someone for herself, but has repeatedly failed. Claudia leaves for parts unknown, and Louis's relationship with Lestat is worse than ever. During her travels, Claudia meets another vampire named Bruce, who does something to her that Louis will not discuss with Daniel in the present. After seven years of researching vampire lore, Claudia returns to take Louis away with her. Louis is tempted, and a furious Lestat attacks, leaving Louis beaten to a pulp.
6	6	"Like Angels Put in Hell by God"	Levan Akin	Coline Abert	November 6, 2022	0.473
Lestat has disappeared in shame, and Claudia nurses Louis back to health. A remorseful Lestat eventually makes overtures to reunite with Louis, who ignores the apologies and gifts for six years. But Louis cannot let go of his connection to Lestat, and he and Claudia consider allowing their maker back into a new version of their family where Claudia is an equal. They give Lestat a list of conditions for his return, but ultimately nothing changes. Lestat relates how as a human he was kidnapped by the vampire Magnus, kept in a room full of corpses that looked like him, and eventually made a vampire, after which Magnus immolated himself. Louis tries to broker peace between Lestat and Claudia but to no avail. Claudia decides to leave for Europe, stowing away on a train, but Lestat locates Claudia and threatens her into returning home, insisting that Louis needs both of them. Claudia decides that she and Louis need to kill Lestat to finally be free of him, and Louis agrees. In the present, Daniel dreams of his first encounter as a young man with Louis and remembers that Louis's young familiar Rashid was also there.
7	7	"The Thing Lay Still"	Alexis Ostrander	Rolin Jones & Ben Philippe	November 13, 2022	0.433
The vampires' eccentricity and agelessness have attracted increased attention, so Lestat decides they should leave New Orleans. Claudia manipulates Lestat into throwing an elaborate Mardi Gras ball before they leave. In the present, Louis explains to Daniel that there are several ways to "kill" a vampire, including starvation, decapitation, fire, and drinking the blood of the dead. At the ball, the vampires choose a handful of guests to be slaughtered and drained afterward. Claudia tells Louis that she has drugged one of them with laudanum and arsenic. As Lestat is poised to drink from the tainted man, he reveals that Antoinette, now a vampire, has warned him of their plan, but he suddenly collapses. A triumphant Claudia explains that she knew Antoinette was trailing her, and that she also poisoned Tom Anderson, from whom Lestat has already drunk. Louis slits Lestat's throat, and he and Claudia leave Lestat's corpse in a trunk to be thrown in the city dump. In the present, Daniel accuses Louis of leaving Lestat somewhere full of rats as a means to save him. Louis reveals that Rashid is actually the ancient vampire Armand and the love of his life.

=== Season 2: Interview with the Vampire – Part II (2024) ===
No. overall	No. in season	Title	Directed by	Written by	Original release date	U.S. viewers (millions)
8	1	"What Can the Damned Really Say to the Damned"	Craig Zisk	Hannah Moscovitch	May 12, 2024	0.282
Louis and Claudia travel to Europe at the end of World War II, searching for fellow vampires. Louis is tormented by a ghostly imagining of Lestat in his head, while Claudia remains emotionally distant. In Romania, while searching for evidence of Vlad the Impaler, the pair are taken in by a refugee community who seem as terrified of vampires as they are of the Soviet occupiers. They eventually encounter a grotesque, feral vampire and its maker, the weary and mysterious Daciana. Instead of going with them back to America, Daciana throws herself into fire. After having heard on the radio that it has been liberated from the Nazis, they go to Paris, the "mother of New Orleans". In the present, Armand resists engaging with Molloy, who gets back at him by constantly engaging the real Rashid in conversation. Molloy's questions jog Louis's memory. Armand officially becomes a participant in the interview.
9	2	"Do You Know What It Means to Be Loved by Death"	Levan Akin	Jonathan Ceniceroz & Shane Munson	May 19, 2024	0.264
During their first five months in Paris, Louis and Claudia are unaware that they have been watched by the local vampire coven Théâtre des Vampires, due to failing to announce their arrival, as is customary for traveling vampires. While cruising through a park, Louis is approached by their leader, Armand, who invites him to their performance. Louis and Claudia are then shown to the rest of the coven, including Santiago, whom Claudia admires, and a portrait of the coven's co-founder, Lestat de Lioncourt. Louis, anxious, tries to confirm Lestat's death with his solicitor, Roget, but fails. During a hunt with the coven, Armand admits that he can tell Louis is familiar with Lestat and advises him to be more discreet to avoid the coven's wrath. In the present, Daniel repeatedly interrupts and mocks Louis and Armand's narration. The couple fight back by digging into Daniel's past with his first wife, Alice, which triggers a flashback of Armand.
10	3	"No Pain"	Levan Akin	Heather Bellson	May 26, 2024	0.194
In the present, Daniel meets a Talamasca agent named Raglan James at a restaurant who provides him with more sources on Louis and Armand. Armand then recounts his first meeting with Lestat and the founding of Théâtre des Vampires to Daniel. The flashback in Paris continues with Claudia going through hazing to join Théâtre des Vampires: working backstage and in the wet room. Meanwhile, Louis keeps rejecting Armand's offer to join the coven despite spending more time together. Haunted by the hallucination of Lestat, Louis accidentally kills a man and leaves him at a park. This leads to Santiago and the coven demanding Armand discipline Louis. During the initiation, Santiago reads The Five Great Laws to Claudia, including prohibiting killing another vampire. She is given her first role for the next fifty years: a baby. Armand decides not to kill Louis; the two bond over their shared history with Lestat and kiss.
11	4	"I Want You More Than Anything in the World"	Levan Akin	Coline Abert & A. Zell Williams	June 2, 2024	0.185
Claudia gradually loathes her play My Baby Loves Windows despite its success. She develops a friendship with a mortal dressmaker, Madeleine, which leads to her punishment and threat from Armand. The Théâtre des Vampires, led by Santiago, confronts Armand about his special treatment of Louis and plots a mutiny. Santiago sneaks into Louis' flat, where he discovers Claudia's old notebooks, containing Lestat's final words. After hearing about Armand's past and difficulties managing the coven, Louis bids farewell to his hallucination of Lestat and resolves to pursue a committed relationship with Armand. In the present, a mistake in their archive sparks a heated disagreement between Louis and Armand. Daniel continues to recover his memories of Armand and discovers images of the three of them from the first interview in the Talamasca's archive.
12	5	"Don't Be Afraid, Just Start the Tape"	Craig Zisk	Jonathan Ceniceroz & Hannah Moscovitch	June 9, 2024	0.248
After Armand departs for a hunt, Daniel and Louis speak privately about what transpired during the first interview in San Francisco in 1973. With the help of the files Raglan James gave to Daniel, the two start to piece together the details of that night. In San Francisco, not long after Armand's intervention, Louis and Armand enter into a heated argument. When Armand brings up his relationships with Claudia and Lestat, Louis finds it too hard to stomach and attempts suicide by going into the sunlight. Armand intervenes and saves his life. Louis writhes in pain for four days before Armand moves him to his coffin and aids his recovery. Armand taunts him by revealing that he has found Lestat telepathically. Lestat tries to reach out to Louis through Armand, but Armand refuses to pass along his message of love. Armand psychologically tortures and attempts to kill Daniel, but Louis stops him. Back in Dubai, both Louis and Daniel realize that Armand had heavily manipulated their memory of what happened that night.
13	6	"Like the Light by Which God Made the World Before He Made Light"	Emma Freeman	Hannah Moscovitch & Shane Munson	June 16, 2024	N/A
In the present, Daniel returns to the same restaurant to meet Raglan James, who informs him that Talamasca cannot protect his life and advises him to fear Louis rather than Armand. The conversation between Armand and Louis is increasingly heating up, and Armand notices Louis has regained memories of what happened in San Francisco. The flashback in Paris continues, with Santiago discreetly circulating Claudia's journals within the coven and organizing a coup. An attack on Madeleine causes Claudia to reveal her vampire nature, leading Madeleine to seek transformation into Claudia's immortal companion. Following Armand's rejection to sire a new vampire, Louis turns Madeleine. Armand informs Louis that he has left the coven after being given a choice. The episode concludes with Armand allowing the coven to ambush Louis, Claudia, and Madeleine and present them as the accused in a dramatic trial-style matinee, with Lestat revealed to be alive and in attendance.
14	7	"I Could Not Prevent It"	Emma Freeman	Kevin Hanna & Rolin Jones	June 23, 2024	N/A
The sham trial continues with Santiago serving as the "ringmaster", riling up the jeering human audience, charging Louis, Claudia, and Madeleine with violations of The Five Great Laws, and reading out Claudia's diary, with Lestat testifying as the victim and Armand being forced to watch from the balcony. Claudia and Louis try to speak in their defense, but the coven cripples their feet and uses their collective power to disorient them. Lestat reveals that Louis demanded him to turn Claudia despite being fully aware of the plight of a child vampire, and he goes off script to apologize for dropping Louis from the sky. Claudia and Madeleine are condemned to death, but Armand uses his powers to commute Louis' sentence to banishment. However, Louis is shoved into a coffin, filled with gravel, and locked in a crypt to die from starvation. Claudia threatens to kill every audience member post-execution, before she and Madeleine are executed by a shaft of sunlight.
15	8	"And That's The End of It. There's Nothing Else"	Levan Akin	Rolin Jones	June 30, 2024	0.291
Freed from the coffin by Armand, Louis sets the Theatre aflame, kills the vampires of the coven, with Sam the only one to escape, and saves Claudia's diaries. He reunites with Armand and they meet Lestat in Magnus's old lair, but Louis only "kills" him symbolically by choosing Armand for the rest of his life. In the present, the interview ends there, but Daniel, having been sent Armand's original script for the trial, reveals that Armand was the director of the trial and that Lestat, not Armand, had saved Louis from receiving a death sentence. Louis fights with Armand but leaves him and Daniel behind in the Penthouse. He travels to New Orleans and meets Lestat; the pair finally reconcile. Some months later, Daniel, turned into a vampire by Armand, has published the interview as a best-selling book; though he openly says it is all true, the rest of the world considers it a PR stunt. Back in Dubai, Louis hears the telepathic rage of vampires around the world demanding his death but calmly dares them to come for him.

=== Season 3: The Vampire Lestat (2026) ===
No. overall	No. in season	Title	Directed by	Written by	Original release date	U.S. viewers (millions)
16	1	"Detroit"	Craig Zisk	Rolin Jones & Hannah Moscovitch	June 7, 2026	N/A
Sometime in the future after a “global catastrophe,” an auction is attended by the noticeably injured Armand and Louis. Those assembled bid on two separate lots holding Lestat’s personal possessions, including a testimonial recorded by Lestat which sets the narration for the season. In 2025, Lestat has released his debut rock album "The Vampire Lestat" and performs in Detroit for an audience of 800 people. His cross-country tour is being filmed by Daniel, who is directing a documentary as part of a cover story that Lestat and his music are a piece of performance art accompanying Daniel’s book. A flashback reveals Louis and Lestat’s reconciliation was halted by the surprise release of the book in 2022, prompting Lestat to launch his music career out of his neighbors’ garage band. At a hotel party, Lestat is ambushed by a local coven resentful of his cavalier attitude toward vampire laws. His band witness the fight, discovering Lestat is a genuine vampire. After fleeing to a motel, Lestat reunites with the vampire Gabriella, who is both his fledgling and his mother. The two kiss.
17	2	"Toledo"	Craig Zisk	Jonathan Ceniceroz & Kevin Hanna	June 14, 2026	0.176
Lestat reflects on his past growing up the son of a seigneur in 18th century Auvergne, recollecting the abusive household he grew up in. Lestat's only familial ally was his mother, Gabriella. At one point, local peasants ask his family to hunt a pack of wolves harassing the countryside, where Lestat volunteers for the task. As he is treated for his injuries, he learns that Gabriella is sick and will die shortly. After he becomes a vampire, he makes her his first fledgling and they kill the rest of their family together. In the present, the rest of the band confronts Lestat. Guitarist Larry, bassist Salamander and drummer TC all elect to continue the tour, where a horrified Alex leaves. Gabriella, now going by Sofia, bonds with Lestat while hunting. Louis attends the Toledo show and Lestat gives him a copy of the book with his notes. After the show, Daniel apologizes for publishing the book without Louis’ permission and leaves him to speak with Daniel’s producers — agents of the Talamasca. The agents ask Louis to take care of Bruce, the vampire who kidnapped and assaulted Claudia on her travels.
18	3	"Toronto"	Claudia Llosa	Anusree Roy	June 21, 2026	0.174
Daniel and Lestat prepare for a recorded video interview for the documentary. During it, they bring up multiple events from Lestat's past, including transforming his friend and first love, Nicholas, and his own saccharine version of his vampire transformation by Magnus. Initially guarded, he eventually reveals the aftermath of Nicholas' transformation, where he became mentally unwell and was eventually destroyed by Armand. After his emotional recollection of Nicholas' end, Lestat leaves the interview. When Daniel tries to watch the footage back, he learns that Lestat was toying with his mind, only revealing the information to Daniel alone. Lestat drives away, while dealing with the actual horrific memories of his transformation by Magnus. Meanwhile, Louis kills Bruce's whole coven and proceeds to incapacitate Bruce, confronting him about his abuse and torment of Claudia before killing him. He goes to a small diner where he interacts with a waitress, Regina, who looks like Claudia. Alex is present at a support group where he sees Armand going by the name Arun.
19	4	"The Devil's Road"	Claudia Llosa	Jonathan Ceniceroz	June 28, 2026	0.135
The band is in high spirits. Lestat goes viral after flying during his last performance. Gabriella disappears, frustrating Lestat. Alex returns, having been coached by someone he calls a "god." Armand returns and attempts to make amends with Daniel who responds angrily and rejects the apology. Armand then offers amends to an annoyed Lestat who at his next performance mocks Armand before a crowd with the song "Big Boss." Armand leaves. Daniel follows. Armand speculates that his and Daniel's vampire bond causes all others to visually disappear when the two are physically close and confesses that his love for Daniel is what prevented him from reading Daniel's mind in Dubai. Louis directs Regina to the Interview with The Vampire book, revealing his vampire nature and her resemblance to Claudia. Though disturbed, she agrees to act as Claudia in exchange for money. In a flashback, we see Gabriella's first abandonment of Lestat on a beach. After the present-day concert, a man seeking to prove the existence of vampires shoots Lestat. The shooting mars the tour. Alone, Lestat considers quitting, but Gabriella returns and convinces him to continue after he hears the voices of vampires who wish to follow his path.
20	5	"New York"	Levan Akin	Daniel Hart & Hannah Moscovitch	July 5, 2026	0.226
In New York, Lestat and the band record his "posthumous" album under Gabriella's supervision. Daniel meets with Armand, who tells him he has been a silent influence in his life for the past 52 years. Louis calls Lestat and begs him to tell him that he is hallucinating Regina's resemblance to Claudia; although Lestat also sees it, he tells Louis that he is imagining things and that he shouldn't see her anymore. The memories of Claudia triggered by the encounter inspire Lestat to record an emotional ballad, "Stained Glass Eyes", which will be the basis of the revamped album. To deter the band from staying with him and ruining their lives, Lestat tells them of an incident in which he woke Akasha, the mother of all vampires, from her slumber; despite this, they ask him to turn them so that they can help complete the album to his standards. The sole exception is Larry, who quits, only to then be driven into suicide by Armand.
21	6	"Montreal"	Jane Wu	Ryan Kattner & Kevin Hanna	July 12, 2026	0.158
Reconciled, Louis and Lestat meet with Daniel to give him an ending for the documentary, noting that he is tanned and seems off. At the band rehearsal for the last concert, Louis gets introduced to Sofia. However, Daniel and Armand leak the incestual truth about Lestat and Sofia’s relationship, causing Louis to recoil and Lestat to have a panic attack, but they eventually talk things out and proceed to meet the witch Merrick Mayfair. She summons Claudia's spirit so they can finally ask her questions and see how she's faring. Claudia's spirit is revealed to be filled with rage, particularly directed at Louis whom she holds responsible for everything that happened to her. She appears in deep loneliness and pain, being unable to find or be with Madeleine and tells both Louis and Lestat to never mention her name again and to burn her belongings. The seance provides them with closure about Claudia and clarity on their relationship. As they sit down on a bench to contemplate and talk, they are distracted by Alex, before Armand and Daniel cut off Louis and Lestat's heads.
22	7	"The Failures"	Alan Taylor	Hannah Moscovitch	July 19, 2026	0.194
While Daniel carries Lestat's head to a bowling alley to allow him to slowly die due to separation from his body, Lestat's subconscious is tormented by visions of Magnus, Gabriella, and all his fledglings, who force him to confront all his failings, resulting in him eventually coming to a point of self-acceptance. Armand keeps Louis' severed head restrained and tries to force him to admit that he was in the wrong for the failure of their relationship, revealing in the process that he found and hired Regina to get close to Louis to manipulate him; Louis eventually gives a heartfelt apology for not being able to truly love Armand, causing him to relent and restore Louis' head to his body. Raglan retrieves Lestat's head from Daniel, revealing that the Talamasca want the Great Conversion to happen as a means of population control. Once restored to his body and reunited with Louis, Lestat confronts his mother and refuses to perform the concert. In a flash forward, Lestat looks out over a ruined city as he reflects on his part in Akasha's rise and the subsequent mass death.

== Production ==
=== Development ===
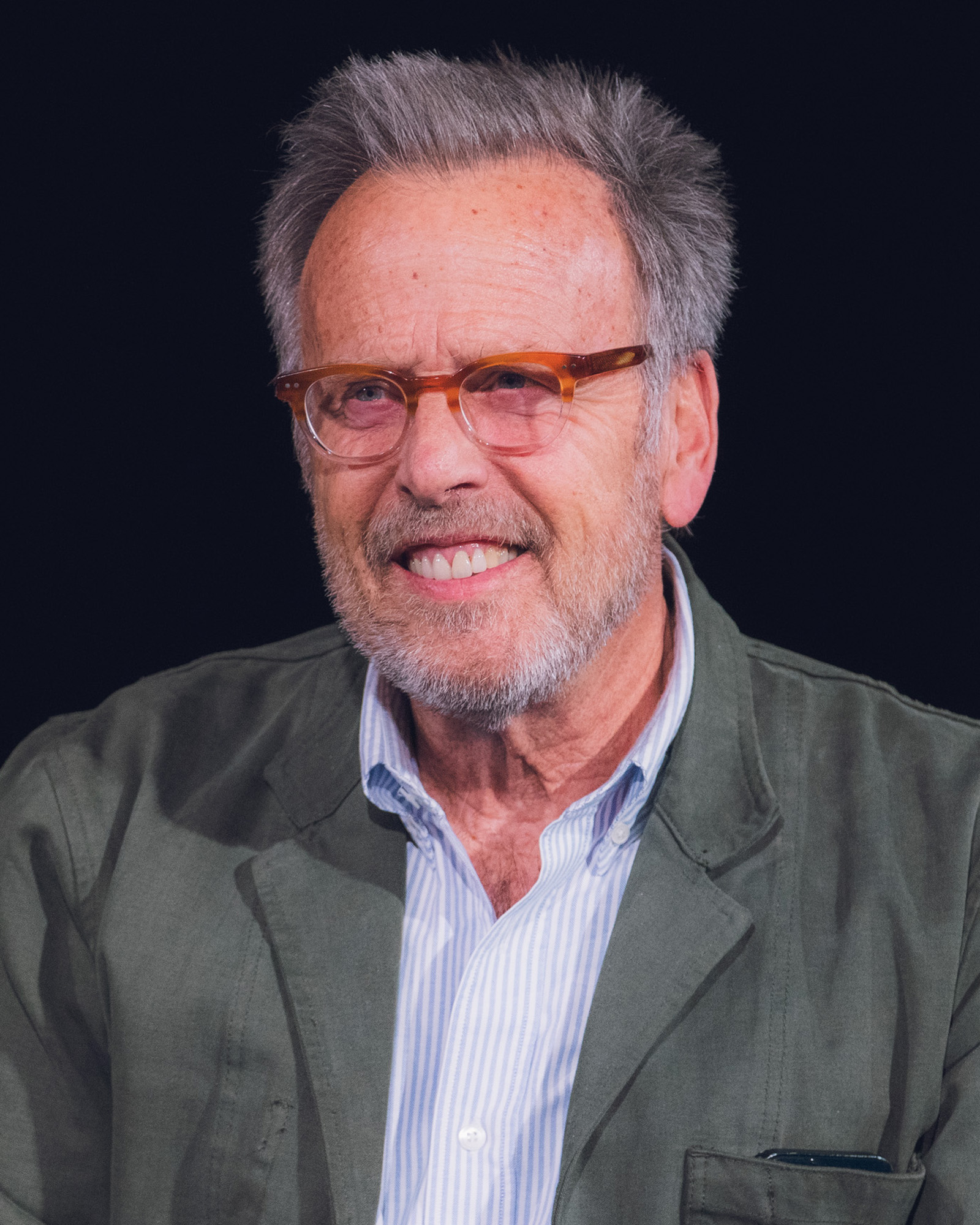
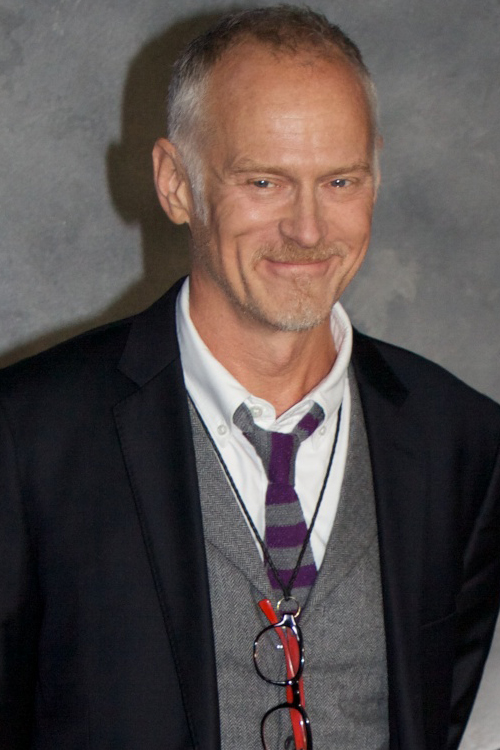
Mark Johnson (left) and Alan Taylor (right) served as executive producers alongside creator Rolin Jones, Anne Rice, and her son, Christopher.

A new franchise adaptation of Anne Rice's The Vampire Chronicles was initially in development as a film series at Universal Pictures and Imagine Entertainment. The novel series had previously been adapted into Interview with the Vampire, starring Tom Cruise and Brad Pitt, in 1994 and the less commercially successful 2002 sequel, Queen of the Damned. Rice's son, Christopher Rice, had adapted the screenplay, and Alex Kurtzman and Roberto Orci were set as producers. The project paused until November 26, 2016, when Anne Rice had regained the rights to the franchise with the intention to develop the novels into a television series, where she and her son would serve as executive producers. Upon this announcement, Rice stated, "A television series of the highest quality is now my dream for Lestat, Louis, Armand, Marius, and the entire tribe. Though we had the pleasure of working with many fine people in connection with this plan, it did not work out. It is, more than ever, abundantly clear that television is where the vampires belong."

On April 28, 2017, it was announced that Paramount Television Studios and Anonymous Content had optioned the rights after a competitive month-long bidding war. Christopher Rice was attached to rewrite the screenplay, with Anonymous Content's David Kanter and Steve Golin joining as executive producers. On January 11, 2018, Bryan Fuller became the showrunner, but quit later that month to not interfere with what the Rices were planning. In a competitive situation, Hulu put the project in development on July 17, 2018, with Dee Johnson replacing Fuller as showrunner on February 19, 2019. It was later announced on December 19, 2019, that Hulu had decided not to move forward with the project, with Rice adding her trilogy Lives of the Mayfair Witches, the rights to which were still owned by Warner Bros. Pictures, to the larger, complete rights package. Paramount Television was in a position to regain the rights to the novels as it was reported the studio was among the four bidders seeking the property.

On May 13, 2020, it was announced that AMC Networks had purchased the rights to the intellectual property encompassing 18 novels and the possibility to develop feature films and television series from the deal. On June 24, 2021, AMC gave an adaptation of the first novel in the series, Interview with the Vampire, a series order consisting of eight episodes, with the series scheduled to premiere in 2022. Rolin Jones was attached as creator, showrunner, and writer. Mark Johnson was named executive producer alongside Jones under their overall deals with AMC Studios to oversee the universe for AMC, with Anne and Christopher Rice set as non-writing executive producers. On July 19, 2021, it was announced that Alan Taylor was attached as an executive producer and to direct the first two episodes of the first season. On September 28, 2022, ahead of the series premiere, AMC renewed Interview with the Vampire for a second season which will cover the second half of the novel, bringing the series to a total of fifteen episodes.

On June 26, 2024, AMC renewed the series for a third season, adapting the second book in The Vampire Chronicles. The season is set to premiere in 2026. In July 2025, the series was officially retitled to The Vampire Lestat, to honor the book the season is based on.

In July 2026, AMC renewed the series for a fourth season, adapting the third book in The Vampire Chronicles, with Hannah Moscovitch taking over as showrunner.

=== Writing and themes ===
With AMC's intention of creating a universe out of Rice's work, show creator and writer Rolin Jones stated that the later books in The Vampire Chronicles influenced the decisions made when adapting the story and acknowledged the challenge between being loyal to the source material and keeping the story interesting to those who are familiar with it. Among the significant changes is Louis's background, which shifted from a white planter and slave owner in the late 1700s to a wealthy black brothel owner in Storyville, a red light district in early 20th-century New Orleans. Jones said that the changes were made to place the story in a "time period that was as exciting aesthetically as the 18th century was without digging into a plantation story that nobody really wanted to hear now". The series also embraces the queer relationship that exists in Rice's novels, unlike the 1994 film adaptation. On the relationship between the two lead characters, Jones stated that the show is a gothic romance and that he wanted to "write a very excitable, aggressive, toxic, beautiful love story". Critics praised the series's writing for avoiding color-blind casting and allowing the series to explore themes such as race, sexuality, history, and abuse.

Other themes explored by the series are subjectivity and memory. With the tagline "memory is the monster", the first two seasons see Louis "recovering repressed memories and reliving the ones he could never forget" while being challenged by Daniel. The series shifts "the whole tone of the world" to Lestat's perspective for season three, in which Lestat refuses to confront his own memories until he's forced to. Speaking at the ATX Television Festival in 2026, Jones admitted that there was "an allergy in the [writer’s] room to the word truth". He went on to say that "there's nothing that's not not truthful" and "there are very few outright lies" in the show.

=== Casting ===
In August 2021, Sam Reid and Jacob Anderson were confirmed to play the lead roles of Lestat de Lioncourt and Louis de Pointe du Lac. Two months later, Bailey Bass joined the cast in a starring role as Claudia, whose age was changed from five-year-old in the novel to fourteen-year-old to avoid Louisiana's child labor law. Kalyne Coleman subsequently landed a recurring role as Grace, Louis's sister. In 2022, Christian Robinson and Assad Zaman joined the cast as Levi and Rashid, respectively, while Eric Bogosian was cast as Daniel Molloy in an undisclosed capacity. In April the same year, Maura Grace Athari completed the cast as Antoinette.

Anderson, Reid, Bogosian, and Zaman reprised their roles in the second season, while Delainey Hayles replaced Bass as Claudia due to "a variety of unforeseen circumstances". In 2023, Ben Daniels and Roxane Duran joined the cast to play Santiago and Madeleine. In February 2024, upon the announcement of the second season's release date, David Costabile joined the cast as a guest star.

The main cast, except Daniels, was set to reprise their roles in the season three. In July 2025, Jennifer Ehle and Damien Atkins joined the show as Gabriella, Lestat's mother, and Magnus. They were also joined by Ella Ballentine, Jeanine Serralles, and Christopher Heyerdahl. Sheila Atim was later cast as Akasha, the mother of all vampires and the title character of the third book The Queen of the Damned in October, while Noah Reid, Ryan Kattner, Seamus Patterson and Sarah Swire joined the cast as Lestat's band members. In January 2026, Amaka Umeh was announced in the role of Dee Pharma, a member of Lestat's entourage.

=== Filming ===
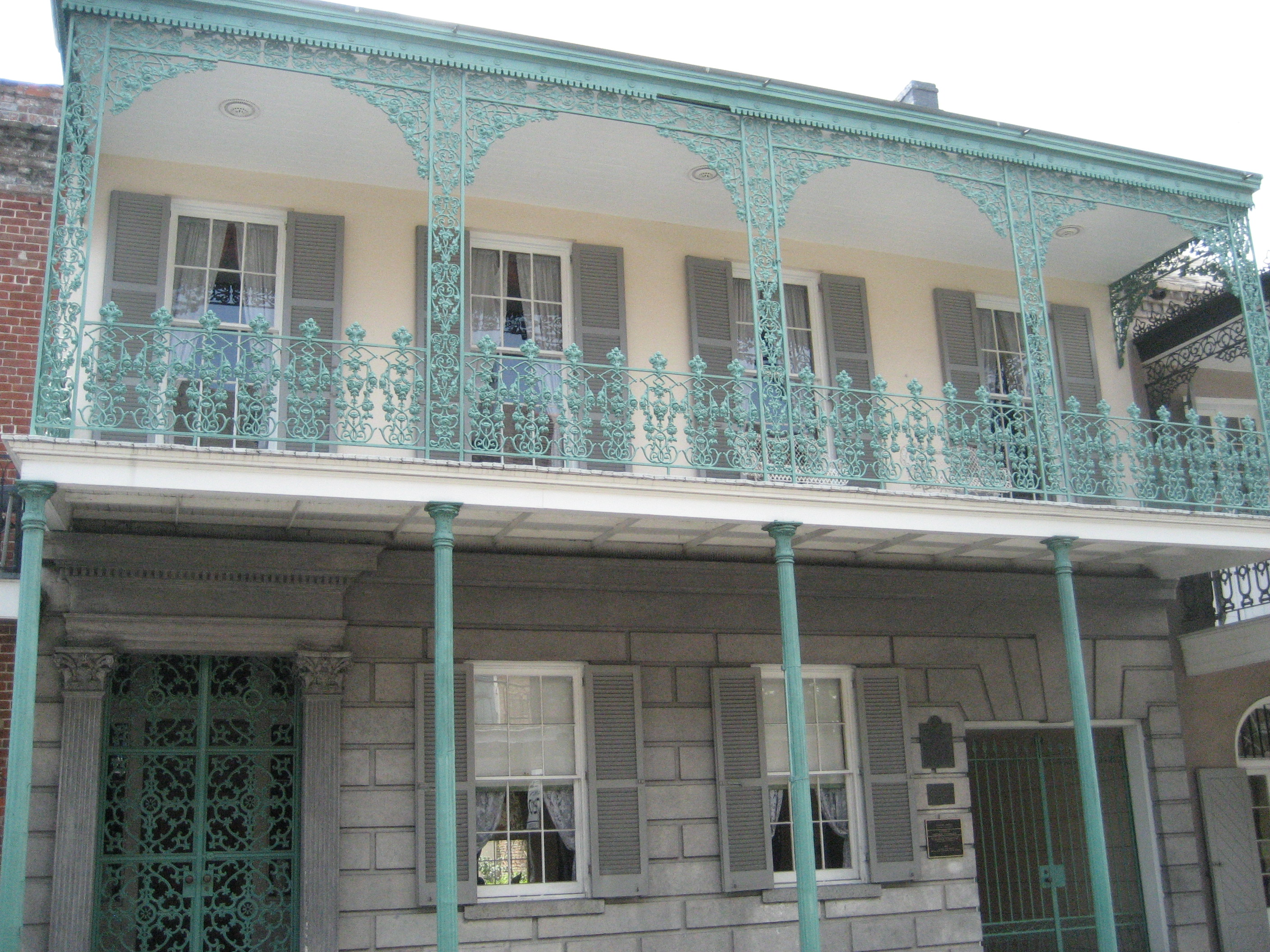
Gallier House was used as Lestat's townhouse during the first season, as described in the novels.

Principal photography for the first season began in late 2021, running from December to April 2022 in New Orleans. Production designer Mara LePere-Schloop recreated Storyville district by building about 40 period building facades for the show's Iberville and Liberty Street on a backlot at The Ranch Studios in Chalmette from October 2021 to January 2022. The show was also shot at several New Orleans landmarks, including Gallier House, which Anne Rice used as the model for Lestat's townhouse, and Beauregard-Keyes House, for the interior of Fair Play Saloon.

The second season officially began filming on April 3, 2023, and was expected to end on August 31, for an "early-to-mid 2024" premiere. Most of the shoot took place at Barrandov Studios in Prague, which stood for Paris, with location shootings including Old Town Square, Vyšehrad complex, and Estates Theatre. Additional filmings were also done in Paris and New Orleans. Craig Zisk was named as one of the directors. For the choreography, animation, and stage concepts of the show's theatre troupe Théâtre des Vampires, the show worked with real-life British theatre company 1927, whose founders Suzanne Andrade and Esme Appleton also starred in the show. On May 3, given the script for the series had already been written, AMC spokesperson confirmed that the ongoing Writers Guild of America (WGA) strike was expected to not disrupt the series's schedule, but rewriting was not allowed. Filming was eventually halted in July due to the 2023 SAG-AFTRA strike and resumed after "roughly 10-week hiatus" on October 2, following AMC Networks' interim agreements with the union and the conclusion of the WGA strike.

The third season began filming the week of June 16, 2025, in Toronto, with Craig Zisk back to direct the first episode. At the premiere of Talamasca: The Secret Order, executive producer Mark Johnson informed that the filming was set to conclude on October 23, 2025.

=== Music ===
Rolin Jones asked his former The Exorcist collaborator Daniel Hart to score the series. Hart and Jones centered the score's style on the period in which the show's protagonists live and discussed early 20th-century American classical musicians as influences. Hart composed a theme for each of the main characters on the tone of their voices so the music would be a part of their internal monologues. Milan Records released the first season soundtrack album on October 22, 2022, which includes the song "Come to Me," performed by Sam Reid as Lestat de Lioncourt. The second season soundtrack album was released on May 17, 2024, five days after the season premiere.

Ahead of the release of the third season, the song "Long Face" (written by Hart and performed by Reid as Lestat) was released as The Vampire Lestat's first official single on February 13, 2026, along with artist profiles for The Vampire Lestat on streaming services. The third season's opening theme, "All Fall Down", was released as the second single on March 13, 2026. A cover of Billy Idol's "Dancing with Myself" was released as the third single on April 24, 2026, "Butterscotch Bitch" was released as the fourth single on May 15, 2026, and "Your Biggest Fan" was released as the fifth single on May 29, 2026. On 2 June 2026, Reid performed a one-night-only 30-minute concert in-character as the Vampire Lestat at the Beacon Theatre in New York City.

== Release ==
The series premiered on AMC on October 2, 2022, with an advance release three days earlier on the network's streaming service AMC+, in all of its regions except Spain, where it premiered on January 12, 2023. The rest of the seven-episode first season was released weekly, with a one-week advance on AMC+. In 2023, the series was aired on BBC Two in the United Kingdom, ABC Television in Australia, and Sky in Germany, alongside a digital release on their respective streaming services. In the Middle East and North Africa region, the series is available on the streaming service OSN+. The first season was included in the AMC+ "programming pop-up" on Max in the US from September 1 to October 31, 2023.

The second season premiered on May 12, 2024. The first season was made available on US Netflix for a year starting August 19, 2024. AMC and Netflix then extended and expanded their deal to include the second and third season in September 2025. The third season, titled The Vampire Lestat, premiered on June 7, 2026. The first three seasons were made available through the Australian free-to-air streaming service SBS On Demand on August 21, 2026, as well as broadcast on SBS2, formerly SBS Viceland.

RLJE Films released the first season on DVD and Blu-ray in region A on September 26, 2023, which includes French and Spanish dub as well as the series's panel at the 2022 San Diego Comic-Con.

== Reception ==
=== Critical response ===
Critical response of Interview with the Vampire
Season	Rotten Tomatoes	Metacritic
1	98% (85 reviews)	81 (31 reviews)
2	100% (79 reviews)	89 (14 reviews)
3	96% (88 reviews)	81 (16 reviews)

All three seasons of Interview with the Vampire have been widely praised. On the review aggregator website Rotten Tomatoes, the overall series holds an approval rating of 99%. Meanwhile, on Metacritic, which uses a weighted average, the overall series has a score of 83 out of 100. IndieWire named the series one of the most essential LGBTQ TV shows of the 21st century.

==== Season 1 ====
Metacritic review
breakdown (unweighted)

Positive
26 (84%)
Mixed
5 (16%)
Negative
0 (0%)

On the review aggregator Rotten Tomatoes, 98% of 85 critics gave the first season a positive review, with an average rating of 8.15 out of 10. The website's critics consensus reads, "With a playful tone and an expansive sweep that allows Anne Rice's gothic opus to mull like a chalice of blood, Interview with the Vampire puts a stake through concerns that this story couldn't be successfully resurrected." Metacritic assigned it a weighted average score of 81 out of 100 based on 31 critics.

Allison Piccuro of TV Guide gave the season a score of 8.9 out of 10, writing that it "successfully breathe[d] new life into an old story" by not being overly reliant on the original material, as many adaptations are. Judy Berman of Time named Interview "the season's best fantasy franchise reboot", despite House of the Dragon and The Rings of Power debuting in the same period. According Matthew Gilbert of The Boston Globe, the show alter[ed] specifics of the novel's story line in ways that wind up working spectacularly well," which might surprise fans of the book and frustrate purists. Jenna Scherer, writing for The A.V. Club, opined that the changes added "fascinating depths" to Louis and allowed the show to explore themes, such as race, sexuality, and history. Giving the series an "A-", she also attributed its success to the show's "gothic melodrama vibe", adding that it had the appeal of Rice's work, which is "smart, thoughtful writing with a heaping helping of Harlequin paperback camp". Brian Tallerico from The Playlist noted how the show found a balance between "the Southern Gothic escapism of something like True Blood with the rich cultural commentary of Hannibal". In an article highlighting race change in TV adaptations, Kelly Lawler for USA Today stated that Interview is "a story that is very Black and very gay, and it never feels like either of these choices is tokenism". Meanwhile, on the change to the framing device through Daniel Molloy, Darrin Franich for Entertainment Weekly opined that "there's a legacy-sequel quality to [it], a sense that all parties need to re-examine their lore". He gave the show a grade of "B".

However, some critics lamented the loss of subtlety in the writing. Tallerico found Molloy "can feel a bit too much like a writer's highlighter". Franich called the Dubai portion of the show "the least compelling subplot" and stated that "supporting characters who should feel crucial don't make enough of an impression". Meanwhile, Charles Bramesco of The Guardian argued that the show's choice to be explicitly queer felt like it's "catering to a viewership that's been made to wait too long to see the objects of their affections get it on" and gave the series three out of five.

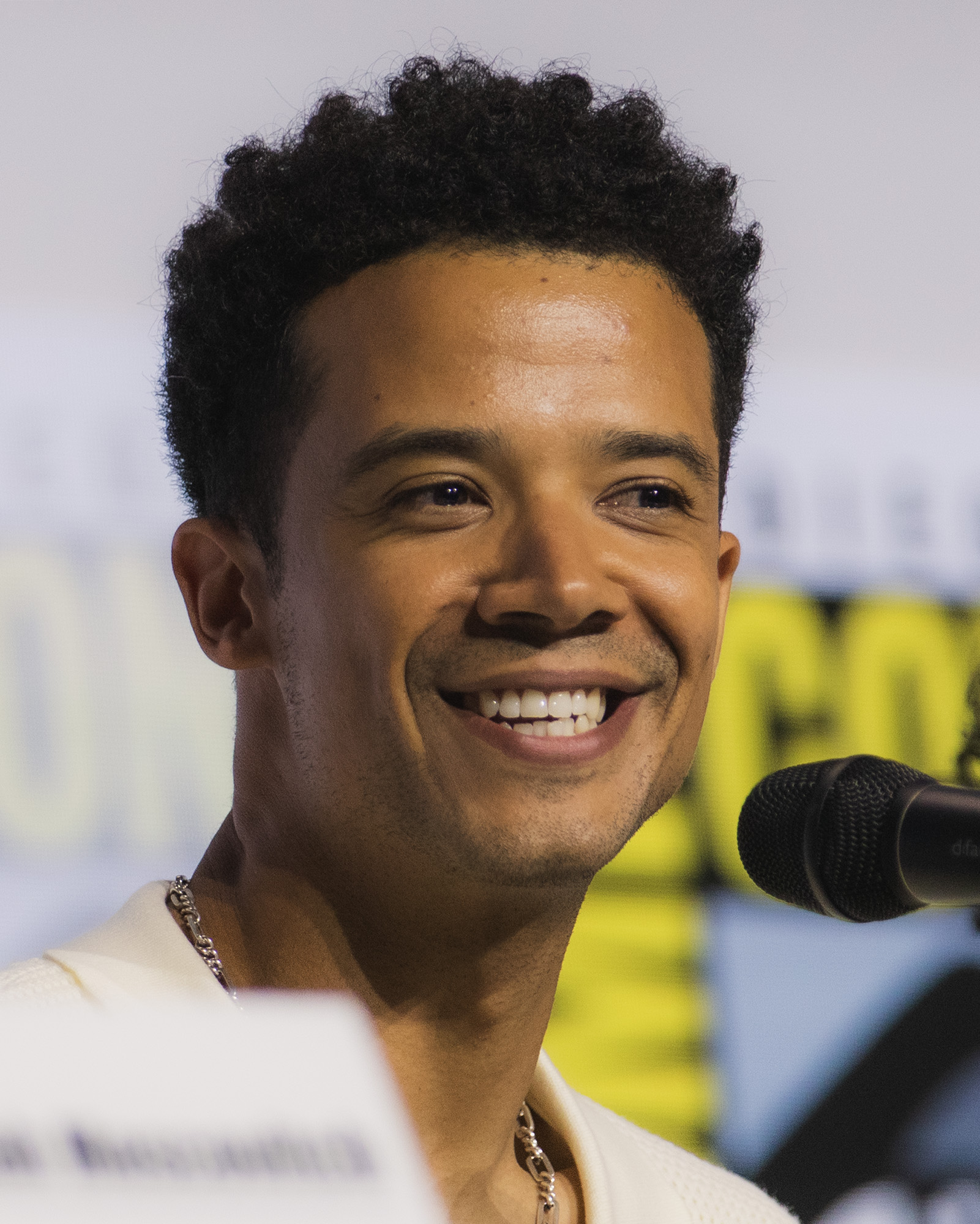
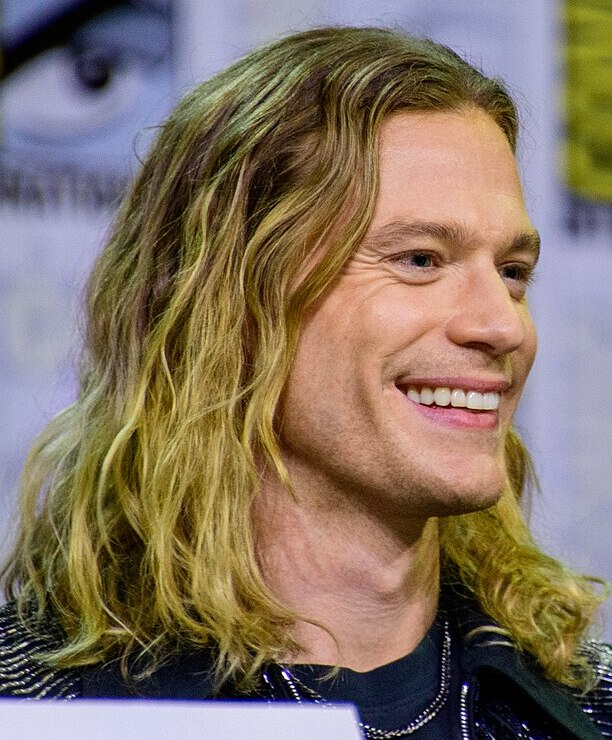
The performances of Jacob Anderson and Sam Reid and their chemistry were praised by critics.

The performances of the main cast were all praised by critics, with Anderson and Reid and their chemistry receiving particular praise. Scherer noted that Anderson proved he was "more than ready" to lead his own series, stating: "He believably plays all the stages of Louis' life." In the publication's best TV performance of the year list, Saloni Gajjar stated that Anderson "arguably exceeded" Brad Pitt's performance in the 1994 film adaptation. Meanwhile, Kayleigh Donaldson of Consequence felt Reid's performance was "directly taken from the novels, as opposed to the camp eccentricity of Tom Cruise". IndieWire included Reid in its best film and TV performance list of the year and stated, "Every minute of Reid's performance here is a master class in manipulation." Anderson and Reid were listed together by several critics, with TV Guide praising: "Their sizzling chemistry and wholehearted commitment [...] is what makes [sic] Interview with the Vampire work."

Critics also praised the costumes, production design, and music of the season. Benny Bishop of Comic Book Resources wrote an article praising the use of music in the season and stated that the show managed to make "music into a character" by expertly managing its diegetic and incidental music and using it to make a story "just as informed by music as the culture it shows on-screen". Several critics were disappointed about the show's exclusion from the Emmy Awards and included it in their snub lists.

==== Season 2 ====
Metacritic review
breakdown (unweighted)

Positive
13 (93%)
Mixed
1 (7%)
Negative
0 (0%)

For the second season, Rotten Tomatoes reports that 100% of 80 critic reviews are positive and the average rating is 8.90 out of 10. The website's critics consensus reads, "Going from strength to strength with new settings and vivid characterizations, Interview with the Vampire's sophomore season still has plenty of inspiration coursing through its veins." On Metacritic, the season has a weighted average score of 89 out of 100 based on 14 critics, indicating "universal acclaim".

Nina Metz of the Chicago Tribune gave the season a perfect score, calling it "probably one of the best TV shows of the decade". Lacy Baugher Milas of Paste dubbed Interview "the best sort of genre series", describing it as not just a good tale but also a reflection of "genuine truths about the human experience of the world we live in now". Several critics opined the second season is better than the first for its commitment to embrace its melodramatic features, which Gavia Baker-Whitelaw of TV Guide believed is what makes the series "so compelling". She gave the season a score 9 out of 10. Matthew Gilbert of The Boston Globe described the show's writing as "elegant and, at times, moving". Carol Midgley of The Times gave the season three stars out of five, saying it was "bleaker and less camp" and "things can get repetitive". Samantha Nelson of IGN considered the show's attempt to connect with other shows in the Immortal Universe to be not too awkward but described it as "Daniel being recruited into the Avengers Initiative".

Critics praised performances by the main cast; however, some lamented Lestat's reduced appearance after the previous season's finale. Kayleigh Donaldson of TheWrap noted that "the magnetism of Jacob Anderson and those around him" kept the show's quality. Jackson McHenry wrote in Vulture's top performances of the year list that Anderson deserves "immense credit for grounding the series". Andy Smith of TVLine named Anderson as an honorable mention in the publication's performer of the week for the eighth episode, while Sam Reid was mentioned for the seventh. Collider's Carly Lane wrote that Reid was able to "inhabit facets of the character we've never really seen before". Nelson dubbed Hayles's Claudia as a "worthy successor" to Bass's, while David Opie of Empire noted that Hayles "brings a newfound maturity to Claudia". Giving the season another perfect score, Kaiya Shunyata of Dread Central wrote that Anderson, Bogosian, and Zaman were "a match made in television heaven" for their performances. Collider, TV Guide and TV Insider named Interview their best television show of 2024.

==== Season 3 ====
Metacritic review
breakdown (unweighted)

Positive
14 (88%)
Mixed
2 (13%)
Negative
0 (0%)

For the third season, which was re-titled to The Vampire Lestat, Rotten Tomatoes reported that 96% of 88 critic reviews were positive and the average rating is 8.50 out of 10. The website's critics consensus reads, "As made evident in Interview with the Vampire, Sam Reid perfectly embodies this luridly divine undead Frenchman, but The Vampire Lestat makes him a snarling, campy, and utterly magnetic star who unapologetically commands your attention." On Metacritic, the season has a weighted average score of 81 out of 100 based on 16 critics, indicating "universal acclaim".

Overall, critics noted that The Vampire Lestat broke from the tone of the previous two seasons. Judy Berman of Time described the show as shifting from an epic "dark romance" to "apocalyptic camp." Alison Herman of Variety wrote that the season three tone, "reaches new heights of operatic emotion and gleeful depravity."

=== Critics' top ten lists ===
Interview with the Vampire was named the best reviewed horror series of 2022 by Rotten Tomatoes, as well as one of the best reviewed TV series and new series of the year. The series was placed at number 19 on Metacritic's year-end list of most mentioned TV shows by critics as "Best of 2022".

2022 (Note: The lists indicated with "–" are not ranked—they each consist of ten shows in alphabetical order.)
- 3 The Mary Sue
- 4 Film School Rejects
- 4 Mashable
- 4 Metro Weekly
- 5 Bleeding Cool
- 5 San Antonio Express-News
- 6 Pittsburgh Tribune-Review
- 6 TV Guide
- 7 People
- 8 The Boston Globe
- 8 TV Insider
- 9 BuzzFeed
- 10 Esquire
- 10 Slashfilm
- – Chicago Tribune
- – CinemaBlend (Note: The lists indicated only include newly released shows and limited series.)
- – GameSpot
- – New York Post

2024
- 1 Collider
- 1 TV Guide
- 1 TV Insider
- 2 Artforum
- 2 The Boston Globe
- 2 BuzzFeed
- 2 Den of Geek
- 2 TVLine
- 2 The A.V. Club
- 3 Vulture
- 4 Adweek
- 4 Mashable
- 4 Slashfilm
- 5 The Hollywood Reporter
- 5 Pittsburgh Tribune-Review
- 6 Esquire
- 6 Inverse
- 6 The Ringer
- 7 Time
- 9 Empire
- 9 Variety
- 10 IndieWire
- – Chicago Tribune
- – New York Post
- – Slate

=== Ratings ===
==== Season 1 ====
The premiere of Interview with the Vampire ranked as the number one new series launch ever for AMC+, and along with the return of The Walking Dead, drove the platform to its highest two days of viewership and subscriber growth since its October 2020 launch. The opening weekend performance put Interview with the Vampire alongside The Walking Dead and Better Call Saul as one of the top three new or returning series on AMC+. On AMC, 1.2 million viewers watched the premiere of the series, including 493.000 viewers in the 25–54 demographic based on Nielsen's live+3 ratings, making the series the number one new drama on ad-supported cable in 2022.

Viewership and ratings per episode of Interview with the Vampire
No.	Title	Air date	Rating (18–49)	Viewers (millions)	DVR (18–49)	DVR viewers (millions)	Total (18–49)	Total viewers (millions)
1	"In Throes of Increasing Wonder..."	October 2, 2022	0.15	0.622	0.14	0.690	0.29	1.312
2	"...After the Phantoms of Your Former Self"	October 9, 2022	0.09	0.525	0.14	0.578	0.23	1.103
3	"Is My Very Nature That of a Devil"	October 16, 2022	0.09	0.445	0.15	0.551	0.24	0.996
4	"...The Ruthless Pursuit of Blood with All a Child's Demanding"	October 23, 2022	0.10	0.469	0.14	0.532	0.25	1.001
5	"A Vile Hunger for Your Hammering Heart"	October 30, 2022	0.07	0.465	—N/a	—N/a	—N/a	—N/a
6	"Like Angels Put in Hell by God"	November 6, 2022	0.10	0.473	—N/a	—N/a	—N/a	—N/a
7	"The Thing Lay Still"	November 13, 2022	0.09	0.433	—N/a	—N/a	—N/a	—N/a

==== Season 2 ====
Viewership and ratings per episode of Interview with the Vampire
No.	Title	Air date	Rating (18–49)	Viewers (millions)
1	"What Can the Damned Really Say to the Damned"	May 12, 2024	0.04	0.282
2	"Do You Know What It Means to Be Loved by Death"	May 19, 2024	0.07	0.264
3	"No Pain"	May 26, 2024	0.04	0.194
4	"I Want You More Than Anything in the World"	June 2, 2024	0.03	0.185
5	"Don't Be Afraid, Just Start the Tape"	June 9, 2024	0.04	0.248
6	"Like the Light by Which God Made the World Before He Made Light"	June 16, 2024	—N/a	—N/a
7	"I Could Not Prevent It"	June 23, 2024	—N/a	—N/a
8	"And That's The End of It. There's Nothing Else"	June 30, 2024	0.05	0.291

==== Season 3 ====
Viewership and ratings per episode of Interview with the Vampire
No.	Title	Air date	Rating (18–49)	Viewers (millions)
1	"Detroit"	June 7, 2026	—N/a	—N/a
2	"Toledo"	June 14, 2026	0.03	0.176
3	"Toronto"	June 21, 2026	0.03	0.174
4	"The Devil's Road"	June 28, 2026	0.03	0.135
5	"New York"	July 5, 2026	0.04	0.226
6	"Montreal"	July 12, 2026	0.04	0.158
7	"The Failures"	July 18, 2026	0.04	0.194

=== Accolades ===
Awards and nominations received by Interview with the Vampire
Award	Year (Note: The listed year refers to the date of the ceremony. Delayed awards in 2023 due to the Hollywood strikes are listed based on the scheduled year.)	Category	Nominee(s)	Result	Ref.
American Society of Cinematographers Awards	2023	Outstanding Achievement in Cinematography in an Episode of a One-Hour Television Series – Commercial	Jesse M. Feldman (for "Is My Very Nature That of a Devil")	Nominated	
Astra TV Awards	2023	Best Cable Drama Series	Interview with the Vampire	Nominated	
Astra TV Awards	2025	Best Cast Ensemble in a Cable Drama Series	Interview with the Vampire	Nominated	
Astra TV Awards	2025	Best Actor in a Drama Series	Jacob Anderson	Nominated	
Astra TV Awards	2025	Best Supporting Actor in a Drama Series	Sam Reid	Nominated	
Black Reel Awards	2023	Outstanding Lead Performance in a Drama Series	Jacob Anderson	Nominated	
Black Reel Awards	2025	Outstanding Lead Performance in a Drama Series	Jacob Anderson	Nominated	
Black Reel Awards	2025	Outstanding Writing in a Drama Series	Coline Abert & A. Zell Williams (for "I Want You More Than Anything in the World")	Nominated	
Critics' Choice Super Awards	2023	Best Horror Series, Limited Series or TV Movie	Interview with the Vampire	Nominated	
Critics' Choice Super Awards	2023	Best Actor in a Horror Series, Limited Series or TV Movie	Jacob Anderson	Nominated	
Critics' Choice Super Awards	2023	Best Actor in a Horror Series, Limited Series or TV Movie	Sam Reid	Nominated	
Critics' Choice Super Awards	2025	Best Horror Series, Limited Series, or Made-for-TV Movie	Interview with the Vampire	Nominated	
Critics' Choice Television Awards	2025	Best Drama Series	Interview with the Vampire	Nominated	
Critics' Choice Television Awards	2025	Best Supporting Actor in a Drama Series	Sam Reid	Nominated	
Dorian Awards	2023	Best TV Drama	Interview with the Vampire	Nominated	
Dorian Awards	2023	Best LGBTQ TV Show	Interview with the Vampire	Nominated	
Dorian Awards	2024	Best TV Drama	Interview with the Vampire	Won	
Dorian Awards	2024	Best LGBTQ TV Show	Interview with the Vampire	Won	
Dorian Awards	2024	Best Unsung TV Show	Interview with the Vampire	Nominated	
Dorian Awards	2024	Best TV Performance–Drama	Jacob Anderson	Nominated	
Dorian Awards	2024	Best Genre TV Show	Interview with the Vampire	Won	
Dorian Awards	2024	Most Visually Striking TV Show	Interview with the Vampire	Nominated	
Fangoria Chainsaw Awards	2024	Best Series	Interview with the Vampire	Nominated	
Gayming Awards	2025	LGBTQ+ Geek Entertainment of the Year Award	Interview with the Vampire	Nominated	
GLAAD Media Awards	2023	Outstanding New TV Series	Interview with the Vampire	Nominated	
GLAAD Media Awards	2025	Outstanding Drama Series	Interview with the Vampire	Nominated	
Gold Derby Awards	2025	Drama Series	Interview with the Vampire	Nominated	
Gold Derby Awards	2025	Drama Actor	Jacob Anderson	Nominated	
Gold Derby Awards	2025	Drama Supporting Actor	Sam Reid	Nominated	
Gold Derby Awards	2025	Drama Episode	Jonathan Ceniceroz & Hannah Moscovitch (for "Don’t Be Afraid, Just Start the Tape")	Won	
Gold Derby Awards	2025	Drama Episode	Kevin Hanna & Rolin Jones (for "I Could Not Prevent It")	Nominated	
Golden Claw Awards	2025	Best Horror TV Show	Interview with the Vampire	Nominated	
Gotham Awards	2023	Breakthrough Television Over 40 Minutes	Interview with the Vampire	Nominated	
Gotham Awards	2023	Outstanding Performance in a New Series	Jacob Anderson	Nominated	
HPA Awards	2023	Outstanding Supporting Visual Effects – Episode or Series Season	Ted Rae, Tavis Larkham, Matthew Harris, Hugo Leveille, J.V. Pike (for "Is My Very Nature That of a Devil")	Nominated	
HPA Awards	2024	Outstanding Sound – Episode or Non-Theatrical Feature	Howard Bargroff, Harry Barnes, Jamie Caple, Mark Timms, Adam Armitage, Michael Holubec (for "And That's the End of It. There's Nothing Else")	Nominated	
International Film Music Critics Association Awards	2023	Best Original Score for Television	Daniel Hart	Nominated	
MOBO Awards	2025	Best Performance in a TV Show/Film	Jacob Anderson	Won	
Make-Up Artists and Hair Stylists Guild Awards	2025	Best Special Make-Up Effects	Tami Lane, Howard Berger, Polly McKay, Aneta Janíčková	Nominated	
National Television Awards	2024	New Drama	Interview with the Vampire	Longlisted	
Pride Awards	2025	Best Ensemble Cast (Series or Miniseries)	Interview with the Vampire	Won	
Pride Awards	2025	Best Actor in a Series or Miniseries	Jacob Anderson	Nominated	
Pride Awards	2025	Best Supporting (Actor)	Sam Reid	Nominated	
Primetime Creative Arts Emmy Awards	2025	Outstanding Period Or Fantasy/Sci-Fi Hairstyling	Francesco Pegoretti, Marica Falso, Elena Fabbiani (for "No Pain")	Nominated	
Primetime Creative Arts Emmy Awards	2025	Outstanding Period Or Fantasy/Sci-Fi Makeup (Non-Prosthetic)	Vincenzo Mastrantonio, Daniele Nastasi, Adele Di Trani, Charlene Williams (for "Do You Know What It Means To Be Loved By Death")	Nominated	
Promax North America Awards	2023	Horror/Thriller Program Trailer	Zealot Inc. (for "Eternity" trailer)	Gold	
Promax North America Awards	2023	Key Art: Logo Design	Loyalkaspar	Silver	
Queerties Awards	2023	Best TV Drama	Interview with the Vampire	Nominated	
Queerties Awards	2025	Best TV Drama	Interview with the Vampire	Runner-up	
Rondo Hatton Classic Horror Awards	2023	Best TV Presentation	Interview with the Vampire	Nominated	
Saturn Awards	2023	Best Horror Television Series	Interview with the Vampire	Nominated	
Saturn Awards	2023	Best Television Home Media Release	Interview with the Vampire (Season 1)	Nominated	
Saturn Awards	2025	Best Horror Television Series	Interview with the Vampire	Nominated	
Saturn Awards	2025	Best Television Home Media Release	Interview with the Vampire (Season 2)	Nominated	
Television Critics Association Awards	2023	Outstanding New Program	Interview with the Vampire	Nominated	
Television Critics Association Awards	2023	Outstanding Achievement in Drama	Interview with the Vampire	Nominated	
Television Critics Association Awards	2025	Outstanding Achievement in Drama	Interview with the Vampire	Nominated	
Television Critics Association Awards	2025	Individual Achievement in Drama	Jacob Anderson	Nominated	

== Franchise and shared universe ==
Interview with the Vampire is a part of the shared universe Immortal Universe, which centered around adaptations of Anne Rice's works, such as Mayfair Witches and Talamasca: The Secret Order. In 2023, the short-form spin-off series Night Island was announced to be in development, with Jonathan Ceniceroz of Interview with the Vampire set to write. In September 2025, Night Island was confirmed to still be in development, along with the announcement of an adaptation of Memnoch the Devil.

In 2022, AMC launched The Official Interview with The Vampire Podcast, a pre-recorded weekly audio podcast where host Naomi Ekperigin joined by the cast and crew members to discuss the first season of the show. Ahead of the release of the third season, AMC announced the weekly half-hour aftershow The Vampire Lestat: After Dark, hosted by Lizzie Bassett. The series debuted on May 24, 2026 on AMC+, and was also made available on various podcast platforms.
