= Bailey Bass =

American actress (born 2003)

- Born: June 18, 2003 (age 23); Nashville, Tennessee, U.S.
- Occupation: Actress
- Years active: 2014–present

Bailey Bass (born June 18, 2003) is an American actress. She is known for her roles as Tsireya in James Cameron's Avatar franchise (2022–present) and Claudia in the television series Interview with the Vampire (2022).

== Early and personal life ==
Bailey Bass was born on June 18, 2003 in Nashville, Tennessee. She has two younger brothers.

Bass has said that she feels very connected to New York City, where she was raised in a "predominately Russian neighborhood" in Brooklyn. Bass is biracial and is of African-American and Belarusian descent. She speaks Russian. She attends Columbia University, pursuing a degree in psychology.

== Career ==
Bass's first acting role was a My Little Pony commercial when she was 5 1/2. In 2011 she appeared in a Purell commercial alongside actress Malina Weissman. In 2014 she appeared in the movie Moon and Sun. In 2020, Bass featured in an episode of Law & Order: Special Victims Unit. She also starred in the BET original movie A Jenkins Family Christmas (2021), and another TV movie Psycho Sweet 16 (2022).

In 2017, Bass was cast as Tsireya, a young Na'vi girl who is a free diver from the Metkayina Clan, in James Cameron's Avatar sequels. Early on, Tsireya was described as "the young Neytiri of the ocean", likely in reference to both their statuses as daughters of their respective clans' leaders. Bass is also set to reprise the role in two additional sequels to be released in 2025 and 2029.

In 2022, Bass was cast as the teenage vampire Claudia in the first season of the Interview with the Vampire TV series (2022), based on the character played by Kirsten Dunst in the 1994 movie. Through her jewelry company in 2022, Bass created a vampire-themed ring as a promotion for Interview with the Vampire (2022), which she gifted to several cast members. She left after the first season due to scheduling issues and the role was filled by Delainey Hayles.

== Other ventures ==
Bass was the songwriter and co-producer for Madison Lagares' song "The Holidays," released December 1, 2022.

She also owns a jewelry company called BaiBai Jewelry. The name is an acronym for the phrase "Beauty as Itself" and the brand was designed by Jay Giraldo.

== Filmography ==
Key
†	Denotes films that have not yet been released

=== Film ===
Year	Title	Role	Notes
2014	Moon and Sun	Essence	
2022	Avatar: The Way of Water	Tsireya "Reya"	
2025	Avatar: Fire and Ash	Tsireya "Reya"	

=== Television ===
Year	Title	Role	Notes
2020	Law & Order: Special Victims Unit	Breyona Taylor	1 episode
2021	A Jenkins Family Christmas	LaTrice	Television film
2022	Psycho Sweet 16	Dylan	Television film; Main role; originally titled A Gift of Murder
2022	Interview with the Vampire	Claudia	Main cast; one season
