= David Tattersall =

English cinematographer

- Born: 14 November 1960 (age 65); Barrow-in-Furness, England
- Years active: 1986–present
- Organization: British Society of Cinematographers

David Tattersall, BSC (born 14 November 1960) is an English cinematographer, known mainly for big-budget, CGI-driven films.

== Education ==
Tattersall studied at Barrow-in-Furness Grammar School for Boys before moving on to Goldsmiths College in London, receiving a first class BA in Fine Arts.

He went on to study at Britain's National Film and Television School at Beaconsfield in Buckinghamshire.

== Filmography ==
=== Film ===
Year	Title	Director
1988	Predator: The Quietus	Leslie McCarthy
1992	The Bridge	Sydney Macartney
1994	Radioland Murders	Mel Smith
1995	Theodore Rex	Jonathan R. Beutel
1996	Moll Flanders	Pen Densham
1996	The Wind in the Willows	Terry Jones
1997	Con Air	Simon West
1998	Soldier	Paul W. S. Anderson
1999	Star Wars: Episode I – The Phantom Menace	George Lucas
1999	Whatever Happened to Harold Smith?	Peter Hewitt
1999	The Green Mile	Frank Darabont
2000	Vertical Limit	Martin Campbell
2001	The Majestic	Frank Darabont
2002	Die Another Day	Lee Tamahori
2002	Star Wars: Episode II – Attack of the Clones	George Lucas
2003	Lara Croft: Tomb Raider – The Cradle of Life	Jan de Bont
2005	The Matador	Richard Shepard
2005	XXX: State of the Union	Lee Tamahori
2005	Star Wars: Episode III – Revenge of the Sith	George Lucas
2006	Zoom	Peter Hewitt
2007	Next	Lee Tamahori
2007	The Hunting Party	Richard Shepard
2008	Speed Racer	The Wachowskis
2008	The Day the Earth Stood Still	Scott Derrickson
2010	Tooth Fairy	Michael Lembeck
2010	Gulliver's Travels	Rob Letterman
2011	Seeking Justice	Roger Donaldson
2012	Journey 2: The Mysterious Island	Brad Peyton
2013	Paranoia	Robert Luketic
2013	Romeo and Juliet	Carlo Carlei
2014	Flight 7500	Takashi Shimizu
2014	Some Kind of Beautiful	Tom Vaughan
2015	The Longest Ride	George Tillman Jr.
2017	Death Note	Adam Wingard
2017	The Foreigner	Martin Campbell
2021	The Protégé	Martin Campbell
2022	Memory	Martin Campbell
2023	Big George Foreman (Note: Shared credit with John Matysiak)	George Tillman Jr.
2024	Dirty Angels	Martin Campbell

=== Television ===
Year	Title	Director	Notes
1992–1999	The Young Indiana Jones Chronicles		21 episodes
2010	The Walking Dead	Frank Darabont	Episode "Days Gone Bye"
2013	Mob City	Frank Darabont	3 episodes
2016	Outcast	Adam Wingard; Howard Deutch; Craig Zobel	5 episodes
2022-2026	Interview with the Vampire	Alan Taylor; Levan Akin; Craig Zisk	8 episodes

TV movies

Year	Title	Director	Notes
1995	Treasure of the Peacock's Eye	Carl Schultz	Part of The Young Indiana Jones Chronicles
2000	My First Adventure	Jim O'Brien; Michael Schultz	Part of The Young Indiana Jones Chronicles
2000	Passion for Life	René Manzor; Carl Schultz	Part of The Young Indiana Jones Chronicles
2013	Reckless	Martin Campbell	

== Accolades ==
Year	Award	Category	Title	Result
1993	Primetime Emmy Awards	Outstanding Cinematography (For "Young Indiana Jones and the Mystery of the Blues")	The Young Indiana Jones Chronicles	Nominated
1993	American Society of Cinematographers	Outstanding Achievement in Cinematography (For episode "Istanbul, September 1918")	The Young Indiana Jones Chronicles	Nominated
