= Assad Zaman =

English actor (born 1990)

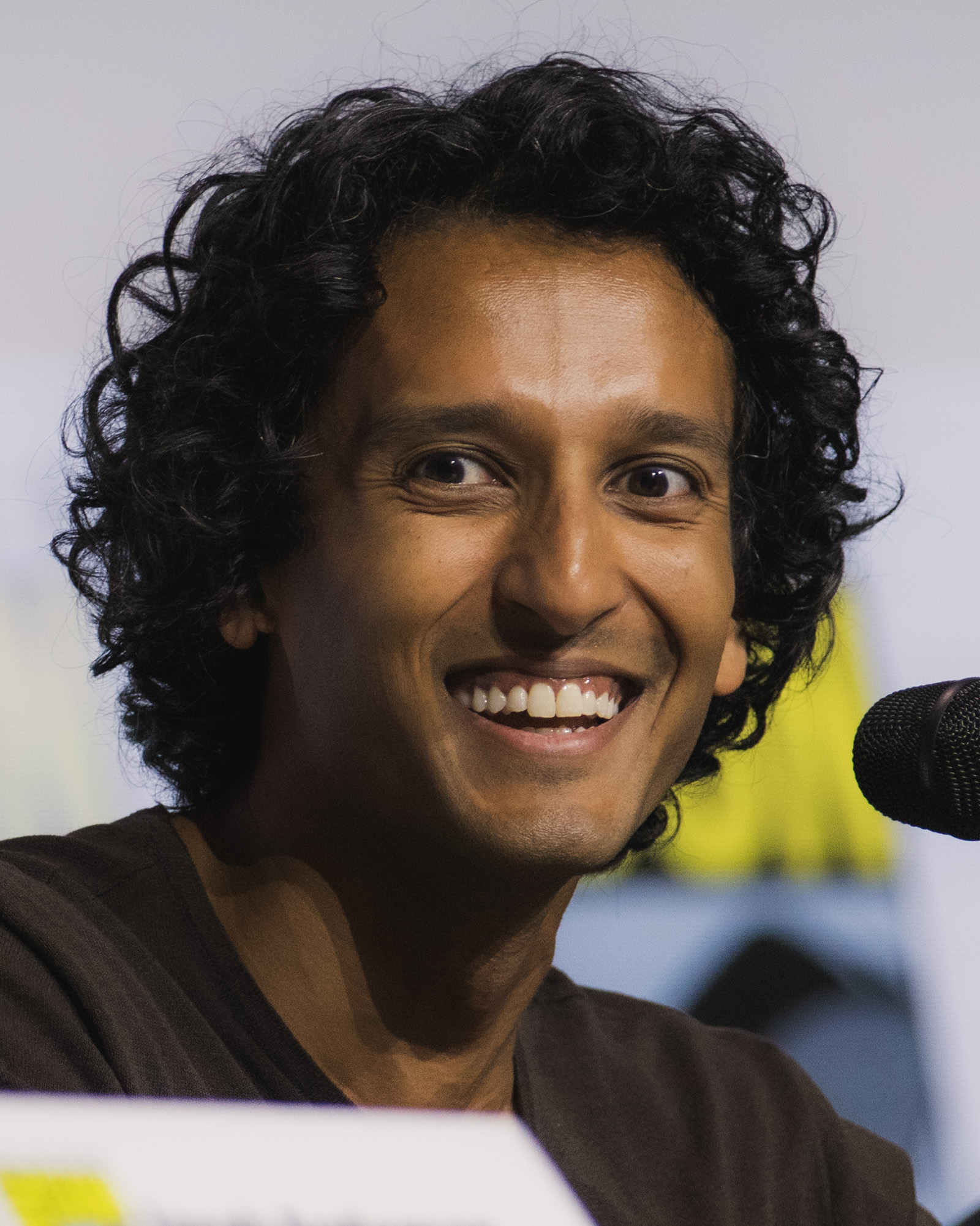
- Zaman in 2026
- Born: 9 May 1990 (age 36); Newcastle upon Tyne, England
- Other name: Assad Zaman Choudhury
- Education: Manchester School of Theatre
- Occupations: Actor, writer
- Years active: 2013–present

Assad Zaman (/ˈæsæd/ A-ssad; born 9 May 1990) is an English actor. He is known for his stage work and his roles in the BBC thriller Apple Tree Yard (2017), the period drama Hotel Portofino (2022–2023), and the AMC adaptation of Interview with the Vampire (2022–present).

== Early life ==
Assad Zaman was born and grew up in the west end of Newcastle upon Tyne. His parents immigrated to England from Bangladesh in the 1980s. Zaman trained at the Manchester School of Theatre, graduating in 2013 with a Bachelor of Arts in Acting.

== Career ==
Zaman made his London stage debut in the 2014 National Theatre production of Behind the Beautiful Forevers. This was followed by his onscreen debut in an episode of Russell T Davies' Cucumber on Channel 4. He went on tour with Ayub Khan Din's play East is East that same year.

In 2017, Zaman played Sathnam in the BBC One adaptation of Apple Tree Yard. He had theatre roles in the stage adaptation of Zadie Smith's White Teeth at the Kiln Theatre in 2018, The Funeral Director on tour, A Doll's House at the Lyric in Hammersmith in 2019, and The Winter's Tale in 2020. He also appeared in the Red, White and Blue installment of Steve McQueen's Small Axe anthology. In 2020, Zaman was one of the producers of the Othello Project, a group of Black, Asian, and biracial creatives within the Royal Shakespeare Company. Born in the wake of the Black Lives Matter movement and initially conceived as an original series of standalone monologues, the project used art to challenge racism by creating a platform for Black and Asian voices and stories. Zaman returned to East is East in 2021, this time in a different role. The show ran at the Birmingham Repertory Theatre before transferring to the National Theatre for additional dates. He expanded into writing with the short play "Laundry", which was produced in 2021 as part of Alphabetti Theatre's Listen Up project.

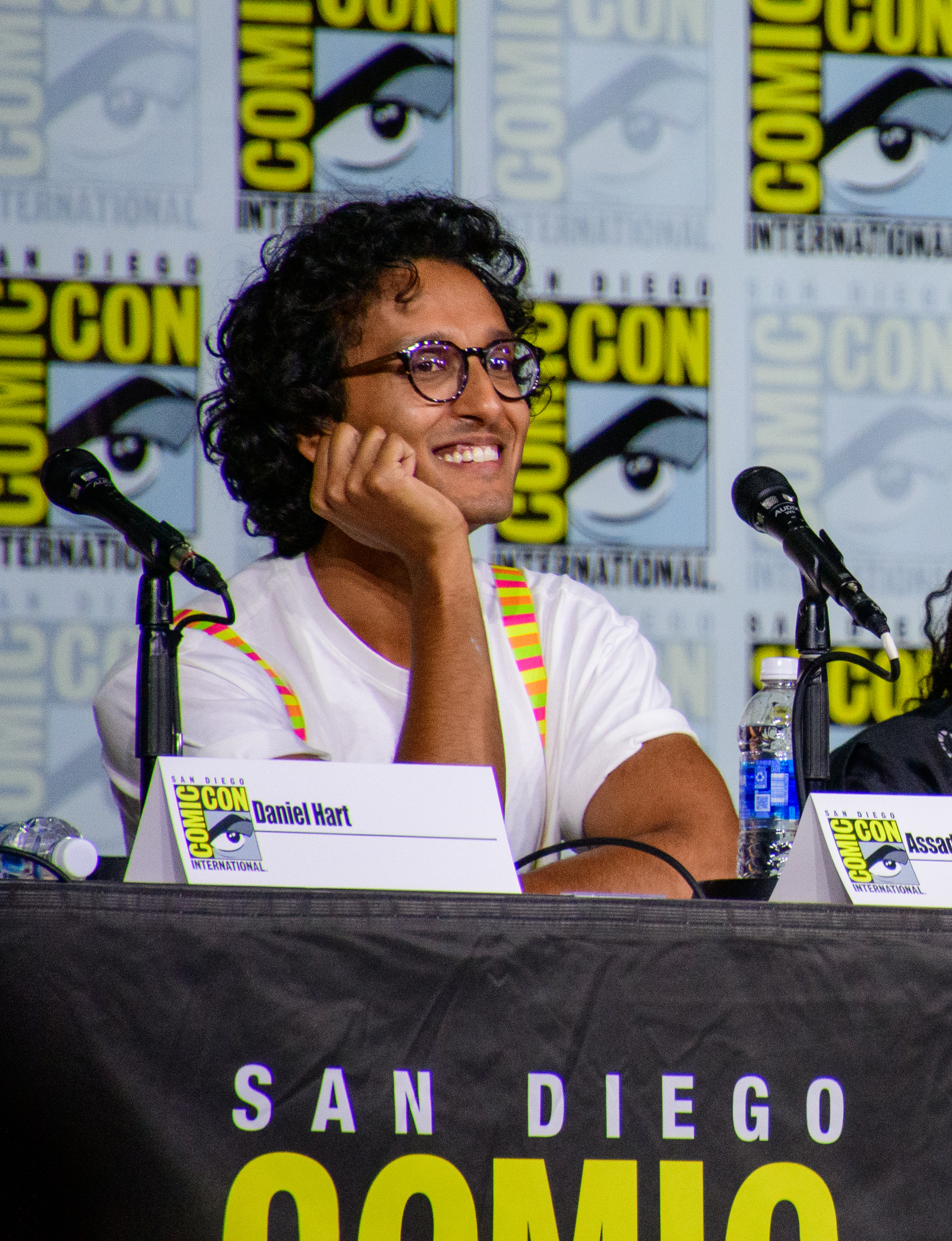
Zaman in 2024

Zaman played series regular Dr Anish Sengupta in the first two seasons of the period drama Hotel Portofino and currently stars as Armand in the AMC series Interview with the Vampire. Zaman was not initially aware he was auditioning for the role of Armand, whose true identity is not revealed until the season 1 finale. After a call with showrunner Rolin Jones in which Jones explained the twist (wherein minor character Rashid, one of the household staff, is the vampire Armand in disguise), Zaman underwent several additional rounds of auditions before being cast. Roxana Hadadi of Vulture praised Zaman's performance, calling it "a master of control," while Ro Rusak of Nerdist highlighted Zaman's "incredible performance" in the show's second season, as one of their Best TV and Film Moments of 2024. In June 2024, Zaman's directorial debut, The Fox and the Grapes, screened at Close-Up Cinema in London.

== Filmography ==
Film

Year	Title	Role	Notes
2015	Behind the Beautiful Forevers	Deepak Rai	National Theatre Live
2020	The Saint of Southall	Rohit	Short film
2024	We Work for the Dead	Lot	Feature film

Television

Year	Title	Role	Notes
2015	Cucumber	Tony	Episode 1.6
2017	Apple Tree Yard	Sathnam	Episodes 1.1, 1.3, 1.4
2019	Vera	Lee Nadella	Episode 9.2 ("Cuckoo")
2020	Our Girl	Hasan	Episode 4.3
2020	Small Axe	Asif	Episode 1.3 (Red, White and Blue)
2022–2023	Hotel Portofino	Dr Anish Sengupta	Series regular
2022–present	Interview with the Vampire	Armand	Main role

Stage

Year	Title	Role	Notes
2013	Tyne	Various	Live Theatre, Newcastle
2013	Dark Woods, Deep Snow: A Grimm Tale	Luka	Northern Stage, Newcastle
2014	Beats North	Al	Edinburgh Fringe Festival
2014	Behind the Beautiful Forevers	Deepak Rai	Royal National Theatre, London
2015	East is East	Saleem Khan	UK tour
2016	A Midsummer Night's Dream	Demetrius	New Wolsey Theatre, Ipswich
2016	Arms and the Man	Sergius Saranoff	Watford Palace Theatre, Watford
2017	Salomé	Young Syrian	Royal Shakespeare Company
2017	Coriolanus	Roman Citizen/Volscian Soldier/Roman Senator	Royal Shakespeare Company
2018	Julius Caesar	Calphurnia/Metellus Cimber/Messala	Royal Shakespeare Company's First Encounters series
2018	I Wanna Be Yours	Haseeb	Paines Plough
2018	White Teeth	Millat Iqbal	Kiln Theatre, London
2019	The Funeral Director	Zeyd	UK tour
2019	A Doll's House	Kaushik Das	Lyric Theatre, London
2021	The Winter's Tale	Florizel	Royal Shakespeare Company
2021	East is East	Abdul Khan	Birmingham Repertory Theatre, Birmingham; Royal National Theatre, London

== Filmmaking credits ==
Year	Title	Director	Writer	Producer	Notes
2025	The Fox and the Grapes	Yes	Yes	No	Short-film
