= Jeff Pope (actor) =

American actor (born 1976)

Jeff Pope (born September 27, 1976) is an American actor known for his roles in The Highwaymen, Interview with the Vampire, The Underground Railroad, Hap and Leonard, and others.

== Filmography ==
=== Film ===
| Year | Title | Role | Notes |
|---|---|---|---|
| 2005 | Hustle & Flow | Trick #1 | |
| 2006 | Eat | Water Man / Security Guard | |
| 2006 | Black Snake Moan | Batson | |
| 2010 | N-Secure | Delivery Guy | |
| 2012 | Bending the Rules | Sound Guy | Uncredited |
| 2012 | Looper | Vagrant | Uncredited |
| 2013 | Prisoners | Sex Offender #1 | |
| 2013 | Hateship, Loveship | Oxygen Delivery Man | |
| 2014 | Endless Love | Mechanic | |
| 2014 | Desiree | Tokenman | |
| 2014 | 99 Homes | Angry Evicted Man | |
| 2015 | Bad Asses on the Bayou | Landry | |
| 2015 | Return to Sender | Sweet Guard | |
| 2015 | I Saw the Light | Red Foley M.C | |
| 2018 | Burden | Cooper | |
| 2018 | Assassination Nation | Officer Richter | |
| 2018 | Back Roads | Rick | |
| 2018 | Supercon | Moderator | |
| 2019 | Darlin' | Clown | |
| 2019 | The Highwaymen | Constable Cal Campbell | |
| 2019 | Into the Ashes | Junior | |
| 2019 | Eat, Brains, Love | Mr. Dipietro | |
| 2020 | Body Cam | Jacob | |
| 2020 | The Secrets We Keep | Mr. White | |
| 2020 | American Reject | Mick | |
| 2022 | Deep Water | Chief Nichols | |
| 2025 | Holland | Squiggs Graumann | |

=== Television ===
| Year | Title | Role | Notes |
|---|---|---|---|
| 2006 | Southern Comfort | Dad | Television film |
| 2009 | $5 Cover | Packy | 6 episodes |
| 2010 | Savage County | Orry Hardell | Television film |
| 2015 | NCIS: New Orleans | Ronnie Doyle | Episode: "Blue Christmas" |
| 2016 | Hap and Leonard | Chub | 4 episodes |
| 2019 | Euphoria | Johnny_Unite_USA | 2 episodes |
| 2019 | Mindhunter | Sgt. Willard Stokes | Episode #2.8 |
| 2021 | The Underground Railroad | Connelly | 4 episodes |
| 2021 | The American Guest | William Howard Taft | Miniseries |
| 2022 | Interview with the Vampire | Finn O'Shea | 3 episodes |
