= Chris Stack =

American actor

- Born: Christopher Stack; June 13; Chicago, Illinois, U.S.
- Occupation: Actor
- Years active: 1999–present

Christopher Stack (born June 13) is an American actor who took over the role of Michael McBain, replacing Nathaniel Marston, on the ABC soap opera One Life to Live from December 3, 2007, to June 17, 2009. Stack temporarily returned as Michael from July 14 to 16, 2009.

== Career ==
Stack was born in Chicago, Illinois and is a graduate of the Actors Studio Drama School at Pace University. In 2000, he portrayed the role of the Coach in Liz Tuccillo's play Joe Fearless Off-Broadway with the Atlantic Theater Company. He starred as Ted in the world premiere of Maria Micheles's play Sleep Over at the Theater for the New City in 2013. In 2023, he played the role of Simon, a drummer based loosely on Mick Fleetwood, in the world premiere of David Adjmi's play Stereophonic at Playwrights Horizons, continuing the role on Broadway in 2024.

Before joining the cast of One Life to Live, Stack appeared on the CBS soap opera As the World Turns as Walt in 2006. He has also appeared on Conviction (2006), Third Watch (2006) and in the recurring role of Alec on The Education of Max Bickford from 2001 to 2002. In 2022, Stack appeared in the first season of AMC's Interview with the Vampire in the role of Tom Anderson.

Stack portrayed Chris in the 2002 film Roger Dodger and Doug in the 2003 film School of Rock.

== Filmography ==
=== Film ===
Year	Title	Role	Notes
2002	Roger Dodger	Chris	
2003	School of Rock	Doug	
2007	The Mini	Rick	
2007	Evening	Phil Mars	
2009	The Undying	Kevin	
2021	Either Side of Midnight	Michael	
2021	Killer Among Us	Clint	
2022	Midday Black Midnight Blue	Ian	Also producer

=== Television ===
Year	Title	Role	Notes
1999	Love Is Strange	Bruce	TV movie
2001–2002	The Education of Max Bickford	Alec	5 episodes
2002–2011	One Life to Live	Dr. Michael McBain / Brad White	121 episodes
2005	Third Watch	Tommy Turner	2 episodes
2006	As the World Turns	Walt	3 episodes
2006	Conviction	Daryl	Episode: "Indiscretion"
2009	Damages	Waiter	Episode: "New York Sucks"
2009	White Collar	John Mitchell	Episode: "Flip of the Coin"
2011	Blue Bloods	Kyle Freelander	Episode: "Thanksgiving"
2012	Law & Order: Special Victims Unit	Wall Street Guy #1	Episode: "Rhodium Nights"
2022	Interview with the Vampire	Thomas "Tom" Anderson	7 episodes

== Theatre ==
Year	Title	Role	Venue	Notes
2002	...In the Absence of Spring...	Larry	Second Stage Theater	Off-Broadway
2011	The Umbrella Plays		The Tank	
2013	Killers and Other Family	Jeff	Rattlestick Playwrights Theater	Off-Broadway
2013	Marie Antoinette		Soho Repertory Theatre	Off-Broadway
2014	Your Mother's Copy of the Kama Sutra	Reggie	Playwrights Horizons	Off-Broadway
2015	Ugly Lies the Bone	Stevie	Roundabout Theatre Company	World premiere; Off-Broadway
2016	The Sign in Sidney Brustein's Window	Sidney Brustein	Goodman Theatre	
2018–2019	Blue Ridge	Hern	Atlantic Theater Company	World premiere; Off-Broadway
2023	Stereophonic	Simon	Playwrights Horizons	World premiere; Off-Broadway
2024	Stereophonic	Simon	John Golden Theatre	Broadway; Theatre World Award
2025	Stereophonic	Simon	Duke of York’s Theatre	West End
