= Dana Gourrier =

American actress

- Education: University of Louisiana at Lafayette (BA); California Institute of the Arts (MA)
- Occupation: Actress
- Years active: 2010–present

Dana Gourrier is an American actress, known for her roles as Tessa on the Netflix show Raising Dion (2019), Cora in the film Django Unchained (2012), and as Minnie Mink in The Hateful Eight (2015), both directed by Quentin Tarantino.

== Early life ==
Raised in New Orleans, Louisiana, Gourrier graduated from Ursuline Academy in 1997. She originally majored in Psychology at the University of New Orleans, but dropped out to pursue performing arts as she had originally wanted. Gourrier received a bachelor’s degree in performing arts from the University of Louisiana at Lafayette, and a master’s in acting from the California Institute of the Arts.

== Filmography ==
=== Films ===
| Year | Title | Role | Ref. |
|---|---|---|---|
| 2011 | Hide | Detective 3 | |
| 2011 | Worst. Prom. Ever. | Teacher | |
| 2012 | Django Unchained | Cora | |
| 2012 | Bullet to the Head | Deputy Coroner | |
| 2012 | Haunted High | Coach Hoover | |
| 2013 | Christmas on the Bayou | Janelle | |
| 2013 | Lee Daniels' The Butler | Helen Holloway | |
| 2013 | From the Rough | Cafeteria Worker | |
| 2013 | Remember Sunday | Bernadette | |
| 2013 | Broken City | Cop | |
| 2015 | The Runner | Daria Winston | |
| 2015 | The Hateful Eight | Minnie Mink | |
| 2015 | Maggie | Woman In Scrubs | |
| 2015 | Desiree | Stella | |
| 2016 | Midnight Special | Sharon Davidson | |
| 2016 | The Whole Truth | Courthouse Employee | |
| 2017 | Kidnap | Deputy Sheriff | |
| 2017 | The Good Time Girls | Ada | |
| 2017 | Same Kind of Different as Me | Willow | |
| 2017 | The Tale of Four | Sweet Thing | Short film |
| 2017 | Heart, Baby | Officer Francine | |
| 2018 | The Domestics | Wanda | |
| 2021 | The United States vs. Billie Holiday | Sadie | |

=== TV series ===
| Year | Title | Role | Episode |
|---|---|---|---|
| 2026 | The Greatest | Odessa “Bird” Clay | Filming |
| 2022 | Ghosts | Jennifer | 1: Dumb Deaths |
| 2022 | Interview with the Vampire | Bricktop Williams | 3: In Throes of Increasing Wonder...; ...After the Phantoms of Your Former Self; Is My Very Nature That of a Devil |
| 2022 | Evil | Yasmine | 2: The Demon of Parenthood; The Demon of the End |
| 2021 | The Good Fight | June Barrow | 1: And the Fight had a Détente... |
| 2020–2022 | P-Valley | Lauren 'The Jukebox' Hawkins | 3: Belly; Demethrius; Snow |
| 2018 | GLOW | Judith | 1: Mother of All Matches |
| 2017 | The Arrangement | Nina | 2: The New Narrative; Sins |
| 2016 | Superstore | Lydia | 1: Dog Adoption Day |
| 2016 | StartUp | Maya | 1: Bootstrapped |
| 2015–2016 | Togetherness | Phoebe | 6: For the Kids; The Sand Situation; Geri-ina; Changetown; Everybody Is Grownups; Kick the Cun |
| 2015 | The Astronaut Wives Club | Antoinette Gibbs | 4: Landing; Abort; In the Blind; Protocol |
| 2014 | Red Band Society | Teacher | 2: Ergo Ego; Pilot |
| 2014 | True Detective | Cathleen | 6: Haunted Houses; The Secret Fate of All Life; Who Goes There; The Locked Room; Seeing Things; The Long Bright Dark |
| 2014 | Ravenswood | Vickie | 1: Revival |
| 2013 | American Horror Story | Chantal | 5: Head; Burn, Witch. Burn!; Fearful Pranks Ensue; The Replacements; Boy Parts |
| 2012 | Common Law | Helling | 1: The T Word |
| 2011 | Memphis Beat | Shawna | 1: Body of Evidence |
| 2011 | Treme | Detective Leroy | 2: Feels Like Rain; On Your Way Down |

=== Video games ===
| Year | Title | Role | Ref. |
|---|---|---|---|
| 2018 | Detroit: Become Human | Rose Chapman | |
