= Rolin Jones =

American playwright, television writer

Rolin B. Jones
- Born: September 22, 1972 (age 54); Los Angeles, California, U.S.
- Education: California State University, Northridge (BA); Yale University (MFA)
- Occupations: Playwright; Television writer; Showrunner

Rolin B. Jones (born September 22, 1972) is an American playwright, television writer and showrunner.

== Early life and education ==
Jones grew up in the Woodland Hills area of Los Angeles, California, and graduated from El Camino Real High School in 1990. He studied filmmaking and English at Cal State Northridge and graduated from the Yale School of Drama in 2004.

== Career ==
=== Playwright ===
In 1998, Jones saw his first original play Once by the Pacific produced at CSUN's campus theatre. While a grad student at Yale, he wrote The Intelligent Design of Jenny Chow, a play that draws both from the life of one of his old schoolmates, his own experience with grief, and the city he grew up in. The play had its world premiere at South Coast Repertory in 2003; Jones was named a 2006 Pulitzer Prize finalist due to his work on the play. During his MFA, Jones also wrote The Jammer, which first appeared at the New York Fringe Festival and features a dedication to the original lead actor, Kevin Rich. He also wrote several short plays, originally for the Actors Theater of Louisville's Humana Festival, that were later produced together as Shortstack at Wellfleet Harbor Actors Theatre.

=== Screenwriter ===
Jones's first screenwriting credit came from the show Weeds; he wrote several episodes during its first four seasons, starting in 2005. He then joined Friday Night Lights as a writer and supervising producer for its fourth season in 2009 and wrote the episodes "The Son" and "Laboring". He was nominated for two Writers Guild of America Award for Best Drama Series for his work on the series and received a 2010 Emmy Award nomination for Outstanding Writing for a Drama Series for "The Son".

Between 2011 and 2015, Jones wrote episodes for several shows including United States of Tara, Boardwalk Empire, Low Winter Sun, and Life in Pieces.

On August 25, 2017, Jones was announced as an executive producer and writer for HBO's historical drama series Perry Mason, along with Ron Fitzgerald, in replacement of Nic Pizzolatto. He and Fitzgerald left in 2021 and were replaced by Jack Amiel and Michael Begler.

On June 24, 2021, Jones was announced as the creator, showrunner, and writer for AMC's television adaptation of Anne Rice's Vampire Chronicles. The series premiered on October 2, 2022 under the name Interview with the Vampire, already renewed for a second season that released on May 12, 2024. The renewal for a third season was announced by AMC on June 26, 2024 and returned on June 7, 2026 under the name The Vampire Lestat. Jones was nominated for a Gotham Independent Film Award for Breakthrough Series in 2023 for the show's first season as well as a Derby Gold Award for Best Drama episode in 2025 for the seventh episode of season two, "I Could Not Prevent It". The renewal for a fourth season was announced by AMC on July 24, 2026 with Jones being replaced by Hannah Moscovitch as a showrunner and serving only as an executive producer.

=== Executive producer ===
On top of being the showrunner of Perry Mason and Interview with the Vampire, Jones served as an executive producer for United States of Tara, Boardwalk Empire, Low Winter Sun, and Life in Pieces as well as Smash and The Exorcist.
