= MTV Movie Award for Most Desirable Male =

This is a follow list of the MTV Movie Award winners and nominees for Most Desirable Male. This award was last given out in 1996, along with its counterpart, Most Desirable Female.

Year	Actor Movie	Nominated
1992	Keanu Reeves – Point Break as Johnny Utah	Kevin Costner - Robin Hood: Prince of Thieves as Robin Hood; Christian Slater - Kuffs as George Kuffs; Patrick Swayze - Point Break as Bodhi; Jean-Claude Van Damme - Double Impact as Chad Wagner / Alex Wagner
1993	Christian Slater – Untamed Heart as Adam	Kevin Costner - The Bodyguard as Frank Farmer; Tom Cruise - A Few Good Men as Danny Kaffee; Mel Gibson - Lethal Weapon 3 as Martin Riggs; Jean-Claude Van Damme - Nowhere to Run as Sam Gillen
1994	William Baldwin – Sliver as Zeke Hawkins	Tom Cruise - The Firm as Mitch McDeere; Val Kilmer - Tombstone as Doc Holliday; Jean-Claude Van Damme - Hard Target as Chance Boudreaux; Denzel Washington - The Pelican Brief as Gray Grantham
1995	Brad Pitt – Interview with the Vampire as Louis	Tom Cruise - Interview with the Vampire as Lestat; Andy García - When a Man Loves a Woman as Michael Green; Keanu Reeves - Speed as Jack Traven; Christian Slater - Interview with the Vampire as Daniel Molloy
1996	Brad Pitt – Seven as David Mills	Antonio Banderas - Desperado as El Mariachi; Mel Gibson - Braveheart as William Wallace; Val Kilmer - Batman Forever as Bruce Wayne / Batman; Keanu Reeves - A Walk in the Clouds as Paul Sutton
