= Queen of the Damned =

2002 film by Michael Rymer

- Theatrical release poster
- Directed by: Michael Rymer
- Screenplay by: Scott Abbott; Michael Petroni
- Based on: The Queen of the Damned by Anne Rice
- Produced by: Jorge Saralegui
- Starring: Stuart Townsend; Aaliyah; Marguerite Moreau; Vincent Pérez; Lena Olin
- Cinematography: Ian Baker
- Edited by: Dany Cooper
- Music by: Richard Gibbs; Jonathan Davis
- Production companies: Village Roadshow Pictures; NPV Entertainment; Material Productions
- Distributed by: Warner Bros. Pictures (Overseas); Roadshow Entertainment (Australia)
- Release dates: February 22, 2002 (United States); April 4, 2002 (Australia)
- Running time: 101 minutes
- Countries: Australia; United States
- Language: English
- Budget: $35 million
- Box office: $45.3 million

Queen of the Damned is a 2002 horror film directed by Michael Rymer from a screenplay by Scott Abbott and Michael Petroni. It is based on the 1988 novel The Queen of the Damned by Anne Rice, the third novel of the book series The Vampire Chronicles, although the film contains many plot elements from the novel's 1985 predecessor, The Vampire Lestat. A stand-alone sequel to Interview with the Vampire (1994), the film stars Stuart Townsend, Aaliyah (in her final film role), Marguerite Moreau, Vincent Pérez and Lena Olin. Townsend replaced Tom Cruise in the role of Lestat, while Matthew Newton replaced Antonio Banderas as Armand.

The film finds the vampire Lestat de Lioncourt (Townsend) awakening in the modern world and becoming a famous singer in a nu metal band, while the ancient progenitor of all vampires, Akasha (Aaliyah), also awakens and seeks him out. It is dedicated to Aaliyah, who died in a plane crash on August 25, 2001, after completing her scenes in the production.

Distributed by Warner Bros. Pictures and released in the United States on February 22, 2002, and in Australia on April 4, Queen of the Damned was panned by critics and was a commercial disappointment, grossing $45.4 million against a $35 million production budget, despite having opened at #1 at the box office on opening weekend. The film series would be rebooted 20 years later with Interview with the Vampire (2022), a television series based on The Vampire Chronicles.

== Plot ==
The sound of a nu metal band arouses the vampire Lestat de Lioncourt from a lengthy slumber, and he proceeds to take over as their lead singer. Achieving international success with the ensemble, which he names The Vampire Lestat, and having revealed the existence of vampires, he taunts his own kind during an interview to advertise his first and only live concert. Jesse Reeves, a researcher for the paranormal studies group Talamasca, is intrigued by his lyrics upon hearing one of his songs play on TV and tells the other members her theory that he really is a vampire. Her mentor, David Talbot, explains to her they already know of his identity and donates Lestat's journal that he recovered so that Jesse can read it, but warns her against pursuing Lestat. In the journal, Lestat recalls that in the winter of 1788, he was brought to a Mediterranean island and vampirized by Marius de Romanus, formerly a talented painter, and his violin playing awoke Akasha, the first vampire. Increasingly intrigued, Jesse tracks Lestat down to a London vampire club called The Admiral's Arms, where he saves her from three vampires and confronts her about Marius.

Visiting Lestat in Los Angeles, Marius warns him that the other vampires will not tolerate his flamboyant public profile; he reveals that Lestat's music has awakened Akasha and unsuccessfully implores him to cancel his concert. Meanwhile, Akasha arrives at the coven, looking for Lestat. After the vampires reveal their plan to kill him at his concert, she torches the club and kills all the vampires inside. Arriving in Los Angeles, Jesse gives Lestat his journal back and asks him to show her what being a vampire is like. He scoffs at the idea, but she convinces him to spend time with her. She later enquires if he can convert her, expressing her desire to be with him and know everything he does. He angrily declines, demonstrating how a vampire preys on human blood before asking her if she truly wants to become one.

Lestat is attacked by a group of vampires at his concert in Death Valley, and Marius aids him in defeating most of them until Akasha arrives and promptly carries Lestat with her to her home on an island resort. During their period, he becomes spellbound and subservient to her. Through drinking from Akasha, he becomes unaffected by sunlight. Jesse awakens in the house where she lived as a child, in awe at the sight of her aunt, Maharet, who later reveals herself as a member of the Ancient Vampires. Fearing Akasha's plans for world domination, the Ancient Vampires decide to destroy her by draining her blood. However, they believe that whoever drinks her last drop will not survive.

Akasha confronts the Ancient Vampires and interrupts their meeting, with Lestat, empowered by her blood, accompanying her. When they refuse to side with her, Akasha commands him to kill Jesse, seeing her both as an enemy due to being Maharet's descendant and as food, with Akasha planning to make an example out of her to dissuade disobedience. He ostensibly obeys, but after drinking Jesse's blood, comes to his senses and is released from Akasha's controlling influence. He demands his "crown", and as Akasha openly offers him her arm to feed on, he then turns on her and, aided by the Ancients, begins to drain her blood, diminishing her power; he goes to Jesse and, cradling her in his arms, donates his blood to her as Maharet, who has effectively killed Akasha by drinking her last drop of blood, turns into a marble statue and "sleeps", becoming the new Queen of the Damned.

Now a vampire, Jesse visits David, accompanied by Lestat, and returns the journal. When David nervously asks her about life in her current status, Jesse offers to vampirize him, but he declines due to his age. Jesse then bids David farewell and goes to embrace him, but he fearfully rejects the embrace; sensing his hesitation, Jesse looks hurt but nods in understanding and leaves with Lestat. Marius then enters David's office, well aware that David has obsessed over him for many years, and politely greets him. Lestat and Jesse walk hand in hand, among mortals, into the night.

== Cast ==
- Stuart Townsend as Lestat
  - Matt Hassall as Lestat's Violinist Double
- Marguerite Moreau as Jesse
  - Richael Tanner as Young Jesse
- Aaliyah as Akasha
- Paul McGann as David Talbot
- Lena Olin as Maharet
- Christian Manon as Mael
- Claudia Black as Pandora
- Vincent Perez as Marius
- Bruce Spence as Khayman
- Matthew Newton as Armand
- Pia Miranda as Jesse's Roommate
- Tiriel Mora as Roger

Jonathan Davis played a Scalper and also provided the uncredited singing voice for Lestat. In addition to Davis, several real-life musicians also appeared in the film including Darren Wilson as Sound Engineer, Rowland S. Howard as Vampire Guitarist, Hugo Race as Vampire Bass, Robin Casinader as Vampire Pianist, and former Jerk member Johnathan Devoy as James. Serena Altschul made a cameo as herself.

== Development ==
Warner Bros. Pictures had acquired the film rights to several of Anne Rice's novels—the first three The Vampire Chronicles and The Mayfair Witches trilogy—after a 1988 takeover of Lorimar Productions. An eventual adaptation of Interview with the Vampire (directed by Neil Jordan and produced by David Geffen) was released in 1994, although not without controversy, particularly over fan reaction to the casting of Tom Cruise as Lestat, an objection initially shared by Anne Rice, which she recanted after seeing the finished film.

After the commercial and critical success of Interview, Neil Jordan began initial development for a film adaptation of the novel's sequel, The Vampire Lestat, although this went nowhere.

As the rights to the novels would revert to Anne Rice at the end of 2000, initial story meetings to adapt one or both of the remaining The Vampire Chronicles began in 1998. The decision was made early to substantially rewrite the plot, and to base most of the movie on the third novel, The Queen of the Damned, as The Vampire Lestat was considered too broad and episodic for a two-hour feature film, although the novel's setup of Lestat's awakening and career as a rock star was used. It was also decided to focus on Lestat as the primary character, and the back story of Akasha and the Story of the Twins were omitted, despite these being virtually central to the plot of the novel.

Displeased with the lack of progress, and more particularly with the studio's lack of consultation with her over the script development, author Anne Rice wrote a critical reply to a fan's question about the film in 1998:

The key factor is that the entire vampire contract terminates in the year 2000. All the properties revert to me at that time, unless production commences—principal photography that is—before then. I don't think it is possible for Warner Bros. to develop anything in that amount of time.

They have not been receptive to me or to my ideas at all.

Not very long ago, less than a year ago in fact, I begged the executives there to let me write a script for THE VAMPIRE LESTAT for union scale (the Writers Guild won't let you write it for free) and a deferred payment not due until release of the picture. They simply weren't interested. It was very painful for me, as I had been talking to a new director they'd hired and we were both excited about the idea.

I felt snubbed and hurt and have not bothered to approach them since. The young director is supposed to be developing THE QUEEN OF THE DAMNED which I think is a bad idea, and basically a doomed project.

In spite of their showing no interest in me as the screen writer, they have not been able to find one themselves for this bizarre idea of THE QUEEN OF THE DAMNED. I'm not too surprised. I think any respectable script writer would be crazy to tackle that novel without having fully developed the background story of Lestat. Anyway, that is where it is.

During 1999, the script was developed by television writer Scott Abbott and Australian writer/director Michael Petroni. Another Australian, Michael Rymer, was confirmed to direct. Rymer suggested the film be shot in his home city of Melbourne, which would save considerably on production costs.

The first actor cast was R&B singer Aaliyah (who had made her film and acting debut in Romeo Must Die) as Akasha, the eponymous Queen of the Damned. The search for an actor to play Lestat took much longer — the idea of Tom Cruise reprising the role was considered but dismissed (ultimately Cruise declined to reprise the role) —although front runners included Wes Bentley, Josh Hartnett, and Heath Ledger. Irish actor Stuart Townsend assumed the role in 2000, and the final cast included Vincent Perez as Marius, Paul McGann as David Talbot, Lena Olin as Maharet, and Marguerite Moreau as Jesse Reeves. Australian actors included Claudia Black as Pandora and Matthew Newton as Armand.

== Production ==
With a large cast of international and Australian actors, Queen of the Damned began principal photography on October 2, 2000, and ended on February 27, 2001, in a former biscuit factory, converted into a studio in the Melbourne suburb of St. Albans. Location filming took place around the city of Melbourne, although some filming was done in Los Angeles. For the scenes of Lestat's concert in Death Valley, over 3000 goths were recruited from Melbourne nightclubs and on the internet, then driven on a fleet of buses to a quarry in Werribee to act as extras.

== Music ==
The songs for Lestat's band were written and performed by Jonathan Davis of the nu metal band Korn, and Richard Gibbs, although Davis' contractual commitments to Sony BMG meant that his vocals could not appear on the soundtrack album. Instead, the vocals were re-recorded by other musicians for the soundtrack's official release: Wayne Static of Static-X ("Not Meant for Me"), David Draiman of Disturbed ("Forsaken"), Chester Bennington of Linkin Park ("System"), Marilyn Manson ("Redeemer"), and Jay Gordon of Orgy ("Slept So Long"). During the end credits "Not Meant for Me" is played. It is Jonathan Davis' version although the credits list it as the Wayne Static version from the album.

Davis also made a small cameo in the film. When Jesse arrives in Los Angeles, a scalper (Jonathan Davis) attempts to sell her tickets to Lestat's show.

The soundtrack also contains other songs featured in the film: "Body Crumbles" by Dry Cell, "Cold" by Static-X, "Dead Cell" by Papa Roach, "Excess" by Tricky, "Headstrong" by Earshot, "Penetrate" by Godhead, "Down with the Sickness" by Disturbed, "Change (In the House of Flies)" by Deftones and "Before I'm Dead" by Kidneythieves.

The score for the film was also composed by Gibbs and Davis. Both the main soundtrack album and score album were released in 2002.

Frank Fitzpatrick and Rich Dickerson were the Music Supervisors for the film and the soundtrack album.

The original studio recording of "Careless (Akasha's Lament)" was written and produced by Davis and Gibbs, during the Queen of the Damned sessions. Vocals were by Davis, keyboards by Gibbs, guitars by James Shaffer, Brian Welch, and Davis, and drums by Vinnie Colaiuta. Davis released the song in downloadable form via Amazon and iTunes on November 16, 2007.

Plans to record a duet between Aaliyah and Davis never materialised, due to Aaliyah's death.

== Release ==
Queen of the Damned was theatrically released in the United States and Canada on February 22, 2002.

=== Home media ===
Queen of the Damned was released on VHS and DVD on August 27, 2002. Queen of the Damned was released on Blu-ray on September 18, 2012, and re-released on Blu-ray Disc on February 7, 2017 with a Digital Copy.

== Reception ==
=== Box office ===
Queen of the Damned topped the box office on its opening weekend, opening at #1 against fairly weak competition with a $14.75 million gross, beating out Dragonfly (2002) with Kevin Costner, and dethroning John Q. (2002) from the previous week, which had dropped to $12.5 million in its second week. That being said, the numbers dropped harshly by the second week, grossing only $5.9 million and finishing at #6. The film finished its theatrical run with a gross $45.4 million on a $35 million budget and is considered a flop.

=== Critical reaction ===
The film received mostly negative reviews from critics, with several reviewers such as Roger Ebert describing it as "goofy" or "damned". The film has an approval "rotten" rating of 17% at Rotten Tomatoes based on 130 reviews, with the site's consensus reading: "A muddled and campy MTV-styled vampire movie with lots of eye candy and bad accents." Metacritic, which uses a weighted average, assigned the film a score of 30 out of 100, based on 31 critics, indicating "generally unfavorable" reviews.

=== Author's reaction ===
By July 2001, author Anne Rice had mellowed her previous stance on the film, much as she had with Interview with the Vampire. When asked about the film's progress, she answered:

Everything I hear about the movie is good. Warner Bros. is extremely enthusiastic. They are working very hard to make it perfect. I have no real news. Let me repeat what I mentioned in a recent message. I met Stuart Townsend, the young man who is playing Lestat and he was absolutely charming. He had Lestat's excellent speaking voice and his feline grace. I cannot wait to see him in the film.

By late 2001, Rice had seen the completed film and was sufficiently satisfied to allow her name to be used on promotional material, although she later became disillusioned about it and dismissed the film in 2003, a year after its release, stating that a television series format would be more suited to the source material. Subsequently, Rice urged fans to "simply forget" about the film, which she said was something she could not relate to as far as her work was concerned. She also said she encouraged the studio not to do the film and that, in the end, it hurt her to see her work "mutilated".

=== Allan Menzies ===
In December 2002, ten months after the film released, Allan Menzies, a man from West Lothian, Scotland, who claimed to have seen it more than a hundred times, killed his friend, Thomas McKendrick, and drank his blood. Upon his arrest, he claimed in court during his trial that Aaliyah's character Queen Akasha told him to do it, saying that it would make him immortal as a vampire. Despite attempting to plead not guilty by reason of insanity, he was declared sane and found guilty of murder before being sentenced to life in prison; a year later, he was discovered dead in his cell of an apparent suicide.

== Future ==
In February 2012, a film adaptation of The Tale of the Body Thief, the fourth book in the series, entered development with Brian Grazer and Ron Howard's film production company, Imagine Entertainment, conceptualized as a soft reboot of the film series. It was reported that screenwriter Lee Patterson was going to pen the screenplay. However, Rice's son, Christopher, apparently had drafted a screenplay based on the novel that was met with praise from those involved in the developmental stage. Rice later confirmed that creative differences that were beyond those involved resulted in the dismissal of the project in April 2013.

In August 2014, Universal Pictures acquired the film rights to the entire Vampire Chronicles book series. Alex Kurtzman and Roberto Orci were named as producers, and the deal included the aforementioned screenplay for The Tale of the Body Thief written by Christopher Rice.

A new screenplay based on the book was written by Josh Boone and was announced in May 2016, with Boone suggesting actor Jared Leto play the role of Lestat. In November 2016, all plans for a theatrical reboot were scrapped, with Rice announcing she had regained the rights to her novels and intended to create a television series starting with The Vampire Lestat.

=== Television series ===
Per Anne Rice's wishes that her books would work better as a television series, in June 2021, AMC announced a television reboot of The Vampire Chronicles, tentatively titled Interview with the Vampire (2022), after the first book, the first season consisting of 7 episodes. The first season is based on the first half of the novel. The series was created by Rolin Jones, who executive produced alongside Mark Johnson, Alan Taylor, Anne Rice, and Christopher Rice. The novel is adapted through the first two seasons, with elements from The Vampire Lestat being used during season two, carrying over to season three. Queen of the Damned is adapted into season four.
