= Prince Lestat =

Novel by Anne Rice

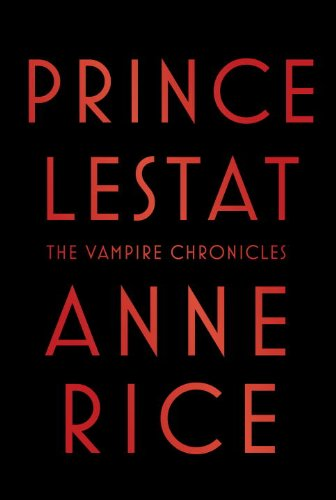
- First edition cover
- Author: Anne Rice
- Language: English
- Series: The Vampire Chronicles
- Genre: Horror, Gothic
- Published: October 28, 2014
- Publisher: Knopf
- Publication place: United States
- Media type: Print (Hardcover)
- Pages: 464
- ISBN: 978-0-307-96252-2
- Preceded by: Blood Canticle
- Followed by: Prince Lestat and the Realms of Atlantis

Prince Lestat is a novel by American writer Anne Rice, the eleventh in The Vampire Chronicles series, published on October 28, 2014. Rice had originally stated the novel Blood Canticle was meant to conclude the series, but in March 2014 she had announced a forthcoming novel that would be a sequel to the first five books and the start of a new series. She also announced via her personal Facebook that she had begun writing a follow-up novel to Prince Lestat, tentatively titled Blood Paradise, then retitled Prince Lestat and the Realms of Atlantis.

When Rice was on her son Christopher Rice's radio program, The Dinner Party with Christopher Rice and Eric Shaw Quinn, she announced that her novel Prince Lestat could be considered a sequel to her novel The Queen of the Damned since many characters that appeared therein will reappear in Prince Lestat, while at the same time, readers might see a revisiting of key themes.

Rice's Vampire Chronicles have sold over 20 million copies in the U.S.

== Plot summary ==
The remaining vampires of the world are in chaos. The most famous of them all, Lestat de Lioncourt, finds himself called upon to come out of his self-imposed exile to reassert order, and is reunited with fellow vampires ancient and new: Louis and Armand, Pandora, Marius, Maharet and Mekare, the former Talamasca leader David Talbot, and even Lestat's distant mother Gabrielle.
