= Interview with the Vampire (film) =

1994 film directed by Neil Jordan

- Theatrical release poster
- Directed by: Neil Jordan
- Screenplay by: Anne Rice
- Based on: Interview with the Vampire by Anne Rice
- Produced by: David Geffen; Stephen Woolley
- Starring: Tom Cruise; Brad Pitt; Stephen Rea; Antonio Banderas; Christian Slater; Kirsten Dunst
- Cinematography: Philippe Rousselot
- Edited by: Mick Audsley; Joke van Wijk
- Music by: Elliot Goldenthal
- Production company: The Geffen Film Company
- Distributed by: Warner Bros.
- Release date: November 11, 1994
- Running time: 122 minutes
- Country: United States
- Language: English
- Budget: $60 million
- Box office: $223.7 million

Interview with the Vampire is a 1994 American horror film directed by Neil Jordan and written by Anne Rice, based on her 1976 novel of the same name, and starring Tom Cruise and Brad Pitt. It focuses on Lestat (Cruise) and Louis (Pitt), beginning with Louis's transformation into a vampire by Lestat in 1791. The film chronicles their time together, and their turning of young Claudia (Kirsten Dunst) into a vampire. The narrative is framed by a modern-day interview, in which Louis tells his story to a San Francisco reporter (Christian Slater). The supporting cast features Antonio Banderas and Stephen Rea.

The film was released by Warner Bros. on November 11, 1994 to generally positive reviews and was a commercial success, grossing $223.7 million against a $60 million budget. It received two Academy Award nominations for Best Art Direction and Best Original Score. Kirsten Dunst was additionally nominated for a Golden Globe for Best Supporting Actress for her role in the film. A stand-alone sequel, Queen of the Damned, was released in 2002, with Stuart Townsend and Matthew Newton replacing Cruise and Banderas, respectively.

== Plot ==
In 1991 San Francisco, reporter Daniel Molloy interviews Louis de Pointe du Lac, who claims to be a vampire. Louis begins with his human life as a wealthy plantation owner in 1791 Louisiana. Despondent following the death of his pregnant wife and their future baby, he drunkenly wanders the waterfront of New Orleans one night and is attacked by vampire Lestat de Lioncourt. Lestat senses Louis's dissatisfaction with life and offers to turn him into a vampire.

Louis accepts but quickly comes to regret it. While Lestat revels in the hunt and killing of humans, Louis resists his instinct to kill, to Lestat's annoyance, instead drinking animal blood to sustain himself.

Eventually, amid an outbreak of plague in New Orleans, Louis feeds on a little girl whose mother died in the plague. To entice Louis to stay with him, Lestat turns the dying girl, Claudia, into a vampire. Together, they raise her as their own. Louis loves Claudia, while Lestat spoils and treats her more as a pupil, training her to become a merciless killer.

After thirty years, Claudia matures psychologically but remains a little girl in appearance. When she realizes that she will never grow older, she is furious with Lestat and tells Louis that they should leave him. She tricks Lestat into drinking the "dead blood" of twin boys whom she killed by overdose with laudanum. When he is weakened, she slits his throat. Though Louis is shocked and upset, he helps Claudia dump Lestat's body in a swamp.

They spend weeks planning a voyage to Europe to search for other vampires, but Lestat returns on the night of their departure, having survived on the blood of swamp creatures. Lestat attacks them, but Louis sets him on fire, causing the fire to spread throughout the French Quarter. In the furor, they escape to their ship and depart.

After traveling around Europe and the Mediterranean but finding no other vampires, Louis and Claudia settle in Paris in September 1870, where Louis encounters vampires Santiago and Armand by chance. Armand invites Louis and Claudia to his coven, the Théâtre des Vampires, where vampires stage theatrical horror shows for humans, in the manner of The Grand Guignol. On their way out of the theater, Santiago reads Louis's mind and suspects that Louis and Claudia murdered Lestat.

Claudia demands that Louis turn a human woman, Madeleine, into a vampire to be her new protector and companion, and he reluctantly complies. Shortly thereafter, the Parisian vampires abduct the three of them and punish them for Lestat's murder, imprisoning Louis in an iron coffin for slow starvation and trapping Claudia and Madeleine in a chamber where sunlight burns them to ash. Armand does nothing to prevent this, but the next day he frees Louis.

Seeking revenge, Louis returns to the theater at dawn and sets it on fire, killing all the vampires. Armand arrives in time to help Louis escape the sunrise and offers him a place by his side. Louis rejects him and leaves, unable to accept Armand's uncompromising way of life and his unpredictable nature as well as knowing that Armand allowed Claudia's murder.

As decades pass, Louis never recovers from the loss of Claudia and dejectedly explores the world alone. He returns to New Orleans in 1988 and encounters a decayed, weakened Lestat, living as a recluse in an abandoned mansion and surviving on rat blood as Louis once had. Lestat expresses regret for turning Claudia into a vampire and asks Louis to rejoin him, but Louis declines and leaves.

Louis concludes his interview with Molloy, who beseeches him to make him his new vampire companion. Louis is outraged that Molloy has not understood the tale of suffering he has relayed and attacks Molloy to scare him into abandoning the idea. Molloy runs to his car and takes off while playing the cassette tapes of Louis's interview. On the Golden Gate Bridge, Lestat appears and attacks Molloy, taking control of the car. Revived by Molloy's blood, Lestat offers him the choice that Lestat "never had"—whether to become a vampire—and, laughing, continues driving.

== Cast ==
- Tom Cruise as Lestat de Lioncourt, a French vampire who brings Louis on his misadventures
- Brad Pitt as Louis de Pointe du Lac, an 18th-century drunkard whom Lestat sired
- Antonio Banderas as Armand, the leader of the Parisian Brood
- Stephen Rea as Santiago, Armand's right hand who leads the Théâtre des Vampires
- Christian Slater as Daniel Molloy, a journalist interviewing Louis
- Kirsten Dunst as Claudia, a young child whom Lestat sired
- Domiziana Giordano as Madeleine, a dollmaker whom Louis sires at Claudia's behest
- Thandiwe Newton (credited as Thandie Newton) as Yvette
- Indra Ové as New Orleans whore
- Laure Marsac as mortal woman on stage
- George Kelly as dollmaker
- Marcel Iureş as Paris vampire
- Sara Stockbridge as Estelle

== Production ==
=== Development ===
The rights to Anne Rice's novel were initially purchased by Paramount Pictures in April 1976, shortly before the book was published. The script lingered in development hell for years, with the rights being sold to Lorimar before ending up with Warner Bros. Pictures. Director Neil Jordan was approached by Warner Bros. to direct after the huge success of his movie The Crying Game (1992). Jordan was intrigued by the script, calling it "really interesting and slightly theatrical", but was especially interested after reading Rice's novel. He agreed to direct on the condition that he be allowed to write his own script, though he did not gain a writing credit. The themes of Catholic guilt which pervade the novel attracted Jordan, who called the story "the most wonderful parable about wallowing in guilt that I'd ever come across. But these things are unconscious, I don't have an agenda."

With David Geffen producing, the movie was given a $70 million budget, unprecedented for a film in the vampire genre. Jordan stated that:

It's not very often you can make a complicated, dark, dangerous movie and get a big budget for it. Vampire movies were traditionally made at the lower end of the scale, on a shoestring, on rudimentary sets. David Geffen is very powerful and he poured money into Interview. I wanted to make it on an epic scale of something like Gone with the Wind.

Jordan also cited Francis Ford Coppola's Dracula as an influence:

Up to that point, Francis Ford Coppola with Bram Stoker's Dracula, he introduced opulence and theatricality. Normally, before that one, I always thought of vampire movies as cheap, cobbled together, brilliant use of minimal resources. Francis made it this epic, didn't he? So when I was given the opportunity to make Interview with the Vampire, I thought, "Oh, it would be really great to expand on that epic sense of darkness and to give these characters huge, kind of romantic destinies and longings and feelings."

=== Casting ===
Rice adapted her 1976 novel Interview with the Vampire into a screenplay with French actor Alain Delon in mind for the role of Louis. Later on, when Interview entered the casting stage, British actor Julian Sands was championed by Rice and fans of the novel to play Lestat, but because Sands was not a well-known name at the time (being only famed for his performance in A Room with a View), he was rejected and the role was given to Tom Cruise. Because of his star power, Cruise received a record $10 million salary and a percentage of the profits. Before Cruise was cast, Rice and the studio wanted Daniel Day-Lewis to portray Lestat after Brad Pitt was cast as Louis, but Day-Lewis turned it down as he didn't want to portray a vampire.

The casting was initially criticized by Rice, who said that Cruise was "no more my vampire Lestat than Edward G. Robinson is Rhett Butler", and the casting was "so bizarre; it's almost impossible to imagine how it's going to work". She recommended a number of other actors including John Malkovich, Peter Weller, Jeremy Irons, Rutger Hauer, and Alexander Godunov. She suggested that Pitt and Cruise switch roles, stating that "I tried for a long time to tell them that they should just reverse these roles—have Brad Pitt play Lestat and have Tom Cruise play Louis. Of course, they don't listen to me."

Eventually, Rice became satisfied with Cruise's performance after seeing the completed film, saying that "from the moment he appeared, Tom was Lestat for me" and "that Tom did make Lestat work was something I could not see in a crystal ball." She called Cruise to compliment him and admit that she was wrong.

Due to Rice's perception of Hollywood's homophobia, at one point she rewrote the part of Louis, changing his sex to female, in order to specifically heterosexualize the character's relationship with Lestat. At the time, Rice felt it was the only way to get the film made, and singer-actress Cher was considered for the part. A song titled "Lovers Forever", which Cher wrote along with Shirley Eikhard for the film's soundtrack, got rejected as Pitt was ultimately cast for the role, though a dance-pop version of the song was released on Cher's 2013 album, Closer to the Truth.

Originally, River Phoenix was cast for the role of Daniel Molloy (as Anne Rice liked the idea), but he died four weeks before he was due to begin filming. When Christian Slater was cast in his place as Molloy, he donated his entire salary to Phoenix's favorite charitable organizations. The film has a dedication to Phoenix after the end credits.

Ten-year-old actress Kirsten Dunst was spotted by talent scouts and was the first girl tested for the role of Claudia. Said producer Stephen Woolley: "We started looking at 6-year-olds, which is about Claudia's age in the book, but the role is too demanding for a 6-year-old. We needed a child with a mind capable of grasping the fine points of the difficult monologues Claudia has, and Kirsten was the first actress we saw. She gave a wonderful reading but we thought it was too good to be true, so we saw thousands of other girls. In the end we came back to Kirsten--she's quite extraordinary in the part." Julia Stiles also auditioned for Claudia but Neil Jordan considered her "too old".

=== Filming ===
Filming took place primarily in New Orleans and in London, with limited location shooting done in San Francisco and Paris. Louis's plantation was a combination of primarily Destrehan Plantation, just west of New Orleans, and Oak Alley Plantation in nearby Vacherie. The depiction of 18th- and early-19th-century New Orleans was achieved with a combination of location shooting in the French Quarter of New Orleans and filming on a purpose-built waterfront set along the Mississippi River. Production then moved to London, where interior sets were constructed at Pinewood Studios. The sets designed by Dante Ferretti included the interiors of Louis, Lestat and Claudia's New Orleans townhouse, Claudia and Louis's Paris hotel suite, the Théâtre des Vampires (built on Pinewood's 007 Stage), and the catacombs where the Parisian vampires live. Shooting took place in San Francisco, mainly on the Golden Gate Bridge, with the external façade of Louis's hotel located at the intersection of Taylor Street, Market Street, and Golden Gate Avenue.

Brad Pitt admitted in a 2011 interview with Entertainment Weekly that he was "miserable" while making the film and even tried to buy himself out of his contract at one point. Pitt called the production "six months in the f—ing dark" because of the almost-exclusive night shoots, filmed mostly in London in the depths of winter, which sent him into a depression. The script, which he received only two weeks prior to filming, was also a source of disappointment. He unfavorably contrasted the character of Louis which he had admired in the book to that presented in the script:

In the book you have this guy asking, "Who am I?" Which was probably applicable to me at that time: "Am I good? Am I of the angels? Am I bad? Am I of the devil?" In the book it is a guy going on this search of discovery. And in the meantime, he has this Lestat character that he's entranced by and abhors. ... In the movie, they took the sensational aspects of Lestat and made that the pulse of the film, and those things are very enjoyable and very good, but for me, there was just nothing to do—you just sit and watch.

=== Visual effects ===
Visual effects were overseen by Stan Winston and his team. At the same time, the new visual effects company Digital Domain was responsible for creating the visual effects under Visual Effects Supervisor Robert Legato. Director Neil Jordan was initially hesitant to use Stan Winston Studios, because they had gained a reputation for specializing in large-scale animatronics and CGI with Jurassic Park and Terminator 2: Judgment Day; Interview with the Vampire was going to require mostly special makeup effects. Winston designed the characters' vampire appearances and makeup effects, including a technique for stenciling translucent blue veins on the actors' faces. This required the actors to hang upside down for 30 minutes, so that the blood would rush to their heads and cause their veins to protrude, enabling the makeup artists to trace realistic patterns.

Digital effects were used mainly to add small details or to enhance certain physical effects, like the burning of the New Orleans set or the burning of Louis's plantation, whereby CGI flames were imposed on a miniature of the house. The most difficult digital effects to illustrate were Louis and Claudia's transformations into vampires, which were technologically very advanced for the time. The scene where Claudia cuts Lestat's throat was achieved by transferring from Tom Cruise bleeding from a prosthetic wound to an animatronic model designed to "wither" as it bled out, enhanced with CGI blood. Winston also sculpted the rough model for the charred remains of Claudia and Madeleine, using archival photographs of victims from Hiroshima for inspiration.

=== Pre-screening ===
A rough-cut of Interview with the Vampire was shown to test audiences, who, according to producer David Geffen, felt "there was a little too much blood and violence." The screenings were held over the objection of Neil Jordan, who was planning on further paring down the length of the film before previewing it, but Geffen wanted to show the longer version to "get a feel for what the audience wanted." Eventually about 20 minutes' worth of footage was either cut or rearranged before the theatrical version was ready.

== Release ==
=== Box office ===
Interview with the Vampire was a box office success. The film opened on November 11, 1994 (Veterans Day) and opening weekend grosses amounted to $36.4 million, surpassing Home Alone 2: Lost in New York to achieve a November record, and placing it in the number one position at the US box office above The Santa Clause, which opened with $19.3 million. Some in the industry disputed the figure and the range of estimates by others were from $34 to $37 million. At that time, Interview with the Vampire had the fifth-highest three-day opening weekend of all time, behind Jurassic Park, Batman Returns, The Lion King, and Batman. Its opening was at that time the biggest non-summer opening and the biggest R-rated opening weekend ever, with the latter surpassing Lethal Weapon 3. The film held this record until 1997 when it was surpassed by Air Force One.

Interview with the Vampire held the record for having the highest opening weekend for a Brad Pitt film until it was taken by Ocean's Eleven in 2001. In subsequent weeks, it struggled against Star Trek Generations and The Santa Clause. Its total gross in the United States and Canada was $105 million, while the worldwide gross was $224 million, against an estimated budget of $60 million.

=== Critical reception ===
On Rotten Tomatoes, the film holds an approval rating of 69% based on reviews from 71 critics. The site's critics consensus reads: "Despite lacking some of the book's subtler shadings, and suffering from some clumsy casting, Interview with the Vampire benefits from Neil Jordan's atmospheric direction and a surfeit of gothic thrills." On Metacritic, the film holds a weighted average score of 62 out of 100 based on 20 critics, indicating "generally favorable reviews". Audiences polled by CinemaScore gave the film an average grade of "B+" on an A+ to F scale.

Critics praised the film's production design, cinematography, and special effects, as well as the performances of Cruise and Dunst. Of Cruise, Janet Maslin of The New York Times wrote the actor "is flabbergastingly right for this role. The vampire Lestat, the most commanding and teasingly malicious of Ms. Rice's creations, brings out in Mr. Cruise a fiery, mature sexual magnetism he has not previously displayed on screen. Except for a few angry outbursts here, there are no signs of the actor's usual boyishness. Instead, adopting a worldly manner and an exquisite otherworldly look, he transforms himself into a darkly captivating roue who's seen it all". The Washington Post's Rita Kempley said "Cruise brings a wicked wit to the ghoulish role" of Lestat.

The Chicago Sun-Times' Roger Ebert gave the film three out of four stars, writing "the movie never makes vampirism look like anything but an endless sadness. That is its greatest strength. Vampires throughout movie history have often chortled as if they'd gotten away with something. But the first great vampire movie, Nosferatu (1922), knew better, and so does this one." He opined production designer Dante Ferretti "combines the elegance of The Age of Innocence and the fantastic images of The Adventures of Baron Munchausen into a vampire world of eerie beauty", and called the Paris catacomb sets "one of the great sets of movie history". He also praised the casting of Cruise and added, "Dunst, perhaps with the help of Stan Winston's subtle makeup, is somehow able to convey the notion of great age inside apparent youth."

Desson Thomson, also of The Washington Post, was not as enthusiastic about Cruise's performance. He added, "The humor, more subtly embedded in the book, has been brought to the surface as if this were a weekly sitcom called 'Pardon Me but Your Teeth Are in My Neck.'" More critical reviews noted the compressed nature of the film adaptation "left out information crucial to understanding the characters' behavior". In Variety, Todd McCarthy wrote while the film "has its share of riveting moments" and bears a "wonderfully evocative mood", what is "missing is a strong sense of emotional exchange and development among the main characters. The intense bonds of love, resentment and hatred that arc through the centuries among Lestat, Louis, the vampire he creates, and their 'daughter,' Claudia, are only lightly felt".

Of Pitt's Louis, McCarthy said "there is no depth to his melancholy, no pungency to his sense of loss. He also doesn't seem to connect in a meaningful way with any of the other actors except, perhaps, to Slater's interviewer. This is unfortunate because his profound feelings for Claudia, Lestat and Armand are meant to be among the primary driving forces of the story." Critics also pointed out the film loses narrative steam in its third act, though Maslin commented that the film's final scene provides some rejuvenating thrills. Ebert conceded his only criticism of the film was its thin plot, but concluded that the movie is overall "a skillful exercise in macabre imagination".

Oprah Winfrey walked out of an advance screening of the movie only 10 minutes in, because of the gore and dark themes. She considered canceling an interview with Tom Cruise promoting the film, stating, "I believe there are forces of light and darkness in the world, and I don't want to be a contributor to the force of darkness".

=== Awards and nominations ===
Award	Category	Nominee(s)	Result	Ref.
Academy Awards	Best Art Direction	Art Direction: Dante Ferretti; Set Decoration: Francesca Lo Schiavo	Nominated	
Academy Awards	Best Original Score	Elliot Goldenthal	Nominated	
ASCAP Film and Television Music Awards	Top Box Office Films	Elliot Goldenthal	Won	
Blockbuster Entertainment Awards	Favorite Actor – Mystery/Thriller, On Video	Tom Cruise	Nominated	
Boston Society of Film Critics Awards	Best Supporting Actress	Kirsten Dunst	Won	
British Academy Film Awards	Best Cinematography	Philippe Rousselot	Won	
British Academy Film Awards	Best Costume Design	Sandy Powell	Nominated	
British Academy Film Awards	Best Make-Up and Hair	Stan Winston, Michèle Burke, and Jan Archibald	Nominated	
British Academy Film Awards	Best Production Design	Dante Ferretti	Won	
British Society of Cinematographers Awards	Best Cinematography in a Theatrical Feature Film	Philippe Rousselot	Won	
Chicago Film Critics Association Awards	Best Supporting Actress	Kirsten Dunst	Nominated	
Chicago Film Critics Association Awards	Most Promising Actress	Kirsten Dunst	Won	
Chlotrudis Awards	Best Supporting Actress	Kirsten Dunst	Nominated	
Dallas–Fort Worth Film Critics Association Awards	Best Supporting Actress	Kirsten Dunst	Nominated	
Fangoria Chainsaw Awards	Best Studio/Big-Budget Film		Nominated	
Fangoria Chainsaw Awards	Best Actor	Tom Cruise	Nominated	
Fangoria Chainsaw Awards	Best Supporting Actor	Antonio Banderas	Won	
Fangoria Chainsaw Awards	Best Supporting Actress	Kirsten Dunst	Won	
Fangoria Chainsaw Awards	Best Screenplay	Anne Rice	Nominated	
Fangoria Chainsaw Awards	Best Soundtrack	Elliot Goldenthal	Nominated	
Fangoria Chainsaw Awards	Best Makeup Effects	Stan Winston	Won	
Golden Globe Awards	Best Supporting Actress – Motion Picture	Kirsten Dunst	Nominated	
Golden Globe Awards	Best Original Score	Elliot Goldenthal	Nominated	
Golden Raspberry Awards	Worst Screen Couple	Tom Cruise and Brad Pitt	Won (Note: Tied with Sylvester Stallone and Sharon Stone for The Specialist.)	
Hugo Awards	Best Dramatic Presentation	Neil Jordan (director) and Anne Rice (screenplay/novel)	Nominated	
International Horror Guild Awards	Best Film		Won	
MTV Movie Awards	Best Movie		Nominated	
MTV Movie Awards	Best Male Performance	Brad Pitt	Won	
MTV Movie Awards	Best Breakthrough Performance	Kirsten Dunst	Won	
MTV Movie Awards	Most Desirable Male	Tom Cruise	Nominated	
MTV Movie Awards	Most Desirable Male	Brad Pitt	Won	
MTV Movie Awards	Most Desirable Male	Christian Slater	Nominated	
MTV Movie Awards	Best On-Screen Team	Tom Cruise and Brad Pitt	Nominated	
MTV Movie Awards	Best Villain	Tom Cruise	Nominated	
Nastro d'Argento	Best Production Design	Dante Ferretti	Won	
Nastro d'Argento	European Silver Ribbon	Neil Jordan	Nominated	
National Society of Film Critics Awards	Best Cinematography	Philippe Rousselot	Nominated	
Saturn Awards	Best Horror Film		Won	
Saturn Awards	Best Director	Neil Jordan	Nominated	
Saturn Awards	Best Actor	Tom Cruise	Nominated	
Saturn Awards	Best Actor	Brad Pitt	Nominated	
Saturn Awards	Best Performance by a Younger Actor	Kirsten Dunst	Won	
Saturn Awards	Best Costume	Sandy Powell	Won	
Saturn Awards	Best Make-up	Stan Winston and Michèle Burke	Nominated	
Saturn Awards	Best Music	Elliot Goldenthal	Nominated	

=== Year-end lists ===
- 4th – Sandi Davis, The Oklahoman
- 6th – David Stupich, The Milwaukee Journal
- Top 10 (listed alphabetically, not ranked) – Steve Murray, The Atlanta Journal-Constitution
- Top 5 runners-up (not ranked) – Scott Schuldt, The Oklahoman
- Top 10 runner-ups (not ranked) – Janet Maslin, The New York Times
- Honorable mention – Mike Clark, USA Today
- Honorable mention – Glenn Lovell, San Jose Mercury News
- Honorable mention – Betsy Pickle, Knoxville News-Sentinel
- Honorable mention – Dan Craft, The Pantagraph
- 1st worst – John Hurley, Staten Island Advance
- 1st worst – Jeff Simon, The Buffalo News
- Dishonorable mention – William Arnold, Seattle Post-Intelligencer

=== Home media ===
The film was released on VHS and LaserDisc in June 1995, DVD in 1997 and on Blu-ray Disc in October 2008.

In summer of 2026, it was announced that the film would finally be released on 4K Blu-Ray, scheduled for September 22, 2026. It will include a native 4K transfer, full Dolby Vision, Dolby Atmos, and HDR support, as well as 2 all new featurettes. However, all other special features are from previous releases.

== Soundtrack ==
The film's musical score was written by Elliot Goldenthal. It received an Oscar nomination for Best Original Score, but lost to The Lion King. The score opens with the Catholic hymn Libera Me slightly rewritten to reflect Louis's character. The opening line "Libera me, Domine, de morte æterna" ("Save me, Lord, from eternal death") was changed to "Libera me, Domine, de vita æterna" ("Save me, Lord, from eternal life").

The end credits cover for "Sympathy for the Devil" was performed by Guns N' Roses. This was the band's last major release before the departure of Slash and Duff McKagan.

== Post-film period ==
After the commercial and critical success of Interview with the Vampire, Neil Jordan began development on an adaptation of the novel's sequel, The Vampire Lestat, which ultimately did not materialize. Almost a decade after this film, an adaptation for the third book in the series, The Queen of the Damned, was produced and distributed once again by Warner Bros. Cruise and Pitt did not reprise their roles as Lestat and Louis. Many characters and important plotlines were written out of the film, which actually combined elements of The Vampire Lestat with The Queen of the Damned. The film was negatively received by critics, and Rice dismissed it completely as she felt the filmmakers had "mutilated" her work. During preproduction, Rice had pleaded with the studio not to produce a film of the book just yet since she believed her readers wanted a film based on The Vampire Lestat. Rice offered to write the screenplay herself but was turned down by the studio.

In February 2012, a film adaptation of The Tale of the Body Thief, the fourth book in the series, entered development with Brian Grazer and Ron Howard's film production company, Imagine Entertainment. It was reported that screenwriter Lee Patterson was going to pen the screenplay. However, Rice's son, Christopher, apparently had drafted a screenplay based on the novel that was met with praise from those involved in the developmental stage. Rice later confirmed that creative differences that were beyond those involved resulted in the dismissal of the project in April 2013.

In August 2014, Universal Pictures acquired the rights to the entire Vampire Chronicles series. Alex Kurtzman and Roberto Orci were named as producers, and the deal included the aforementioned screenplay for The Tale of the Body Thief written by Christopher Rice.

A new film adaptation of the book was written by Josh Boone and was announced in May 2016, with Boone suggesting actor Jared Leto play the role of Lestat. In November 2016, all plans for a theatrical reboot were scrapped, with Rice announcing she had regained the rights to her novels and intended to create a television series starting with The Vampire Lestat.

== Television series ==
In June 2021, AMC announced a television adaptation of Interview with the Vampire, giving a series order consisting of seven episodes. The series was created by Rolin Jones, who executive produced alongside Mark Johnson, Alan Taylor, Anne Rice, and Christopher Rice. The novel is adapted through the first two seasons, with elements from The Vampire Lestat being used during season two.

== See also ==
- Vampire films
