= The Vampire Chronicles =

Series of Gothic horror novels by Anne Rice

- Interview with the Vampire (1976); The Vampire Lestat (1985); The Queen of the Damned (1988); The Tale of the Body Thief (1992); Memnoch the Devil (1995); The Vampire Armand (1998); Merrick (2000); Blood and Gold (2001); Blackwood Farm (2002); Blood Canticle (2003); Prince Lestat (2014); Prince Lestat and the Realms of Atlantis (2016); Blood Communion: A Tale of Prince Lestat (2018)
- Author: Anne Rice
- Original title: The Vampire Chronicles
- Country: United States
- Language: English
- Genre: Gothic, vampire
- Publisher: Knopf
- Published: 1976–2018

The Vampire Chronicles is a series of Gothic vampire novels created by American author Anne Rice, that revolves around the fictional character Lestat de Lioncourt, a French nobleman turned into a vampire in the 18th century.

Rice said in a 2008 interview that her vampires were a "metaphor for lost souls". The homoerotic overtones of The Vampire Chronicles are well-documented. As of November 2008, The Vampire Chronicles had sold 80 million copies worldwide.

The first novel in the series, Interview with the Vampire (1976), was made into a 1994 film of the same name. The Queen of the Damned (1988) was adapted into a 2002 film of the same name, which also used some material from The Vampire Lestat (1985). Both films were released by Warner Bros. Pictures. A television series, Interview with the Vampire, premiered on AMC in 2022.

== Books in the series ==
Number	Title	Year	ISBN
1	Interview with the Vampire	1976	0-394-49821-6
2	The Vampire Lestat	1985	1-127-49040-0
3	The Queen of the Damned	1988	978-0-394-55823-3
4	The Tale of the Body Thief	1992	978-0-679-40528-3
5	Memnoch the Devil	1995	0-679-44101-8
6	The Vampire Armand	1998	978-0-679-45447-2
7	Merrick	2000	0-679-45448-9
8	Blood and Gold	2001	0-679-45449-7
9	Blackwood Farm	2002	0-345-44368-3
10	Blood Canticle	2003	0-375-41200-X
11	Prince Lestat	2014	978-0-307-96252-2
12	Prince Lestat and the Realms of Atlantis	2016	978-0-385-35379-3
13	Blood Communion: A Tale of Prince Lestat	2018	978-1-5247-3264-6

Rice considered Blood Canticle a conclusion to the series and thought she would never write about Lestat again. In a 2008 interview with Time, she called her vampires a "metaphor for lost souls", and noted that writing about them had been, to her, "a sort of search for God and a kind of grief for a lost faith." Her 1998 return to the Catholic Church after 38 years of atheism had prompted a change in the direction of her writing that resulted in her 2005 novel Christ the Lord: Out of Egypt and its 2008 sequel Christ the Lord: The Road to Cana.

However, in the same interview, Rice said: "I have one more book that I would really like to write; and the book will have a definite Christian framework and it will concern the vampire Lestat; and it will be a story I think I need to tell. But it will have to be in a redemptive framework. It will have to be where Lestat is really wrestling with the existence of God in a very personal way." That same year she produced a YouTube video in which she told her readers that she had dismissed any intentions of writing any more books in The Vampire Chronicles, calling the series "closed". Later, during a 2012 Q&A in Toronto, Canada, an audience member asked Rice if she would bring any of her old characters back, to which she replied: "I'm not ruling it out. I think it's very possible. I mean, I feel completely open with a new confidence in myself about it. I want to hear what Lestat has to say." On March 10, 2014, Rice announced a new installment of The Vampire Chronicles titled Prince Lestat, calling it the first of a new series. Prince Lestat was released on October 28, 2014. A sequel, Prince Lestat and the Realms of Atlantis, was released on November 29, 2016, followed by Blood Communion: A Tale of Prince Lestat on October 2, 2018.

== Related series ==
=== New Tales of the Vampires series ===
1. Pandora (1998), ISBN 0-375-40159-8
2. Vittorio the Vampire (1999), ISBN 0-375-40160-1

=== Lives of the Mayfair Witches series ===
1. The Witching Hour (1990), ISBN 0-394-58786-3
2. Lasher (1993), ISBN 0-679-41295-6
3. Taltos (1994), ISBN 0-679-42573-X

The Vampire Chronicles series have a few crossover novels with this series, making Lives of the Mayfair Witches part of the Vampire Chronicles universe:

- Merrick (2000)
- Blackwood Farm (2002)
- Blood Canticle (2003)

== Plot summary ==
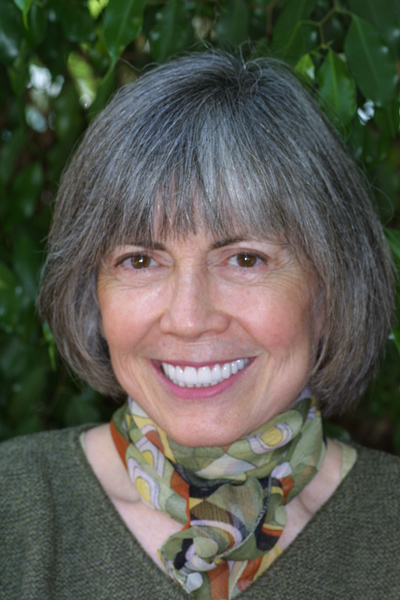
American author Anne Rice created The Vampire Chronicles.

=== Interview with the Vampire (1976) ===
Louis de Pointe du Lac tells a young reporter the story of how he had been made a vampire in 18th-century New Orleans by Lestat de Lioncourt. In creating and sheltering the child vampire Claudia, Lestat and Louis had unknowingly set tragedy in motion.

=== The Vampire Lestat (1985) ===
This book chronicles Lestat's own origins, as he resurfaces in the modern world and attempts to find meaning by exposing himself to humanity in the guise of a rock star. This attracts the attention of the ancient vampire Marius de Romanus, and culminates in the accidental awakening of Akasha, the ancient Egyptian queen and first vampire, who has been immobile for millennia and safeguarded by Marius.

=== The Queen of the Damned (1988) ===
Lestat has awakened Akasha, the first of all vampires, who has in her thousands of years of immobility contrived an idealized way to achieve world peace; by killing almost all males and destroying all other vampires. She is herself destroyed by the vampire witch Mekare, who has awakened and returned after 6,000 years to fulfill a promise to destroy Akasha at the moment she poses the greatest threat.

=== The Tale of the Body Thief (1992) ===
The novel finds Lestat haunted by his past and tiring of immortality. A thief switches bodies with him and runs off, and Lestat enlists David Talbot, leader of the Talamasca and one of his only remaining friends, to help him retrieve his own body.

=== Memnoch the Devil (1995) ===
Lestat meets the Devil, who calls himself Memnoch. He takes Lestat on a whirlwind tour of Heaven and Hell, and retells the entirety of history from his own point of view in an effort to convince Lestat to join him as God's adversary. In his journey, Memnoch claims he is not evil, but merely working for God by ushering lost souls into Heaven. Lestat is left in confusion, unable to decide whether or not to cast his lot with the Devil.

=== Subsequent novels ===
Rice's New Tales of the Vampires—Pandora (1998) and Vittorio the Vampire (1999)—do not feature Lestat at all, instead telling the stories of the eponymous peripheral vampires, the Patrician Pandora from Rome in the 1st century B.C. and the 15th-century Italian nobleman Vittorio.

Armand tells his own life story in 1998's The Vampire Armand, and Rice's Mayfair Witches series crosses over with The Vampire Chronicles in Merrick (2000) as Louis and David seek Merrick Mayfair's help in resurrecting Claudia's spirit. The origins of Marius are explored in 2001's Blood and Gold, and Blackwood Farm (2002) tells the story of young Tarquin Blackwood as he enlists Lestat and Merrick to help him banish a spirit named Goblin. 2003's Blood Canticle intertwines the vampire, Blackwood and Mayfair storylines, and was intended by Rice to conclude the series.

Prince Lestat (2014) rejoins the remaining vampires a decade later as Lestat faces pressure to lead them. Prince Lestat and the Realms of Atlantis (2016) and Blood Communion (2018) continued this new narrative thread.

== Mythology ==
In her review of The Vampire Lestat (1985) The New York Times critic Michiko Kakutani noted, "We learn lots of 'facts' about vampires and vampire culture. We learn that they cry tears of blood, that they're capable of reading other people's minds, that they can be destroyed by fire and sunlight. We learn that 'no vampire may ever destroy another vampire, except that the coven master has the power of life and death over all of his flock'; and we learn that 'no vampire shall ever reveal his true nature to a mortal and allow that mortal to live'." Through The Tale of The Body Thief and Memnoch The Devil, the cosmology of the series expands into exploration of broader supernatural themes and realms, particularly of Heaven and Hell, and also into exploration of apex supernatural entities like angels, the devil, and God Himself. Memnoch also acknowledges that many other types of earthbound supernatural creatures exist aside from the vampires, which leaves open connections to Rice's Taltos and werewolf stories.

=== Backstory ===
A complete, visual genealogical record of all vampire characters found in Anne Rice's series: The Vampire Chronicles and The Lives of the Mayfair Witches. Includes dates of vampiric embrace and, if applicable, dates of eternal death.

Rice chronicles the origins of her vampires in The Vampire Lestat and The Queen of the Damned.

The first vampires appeared in Ancient Egypt, their origin connected to spirits which existed before Earth. Mekare and Maharet, twin witches living on Mount Carmel, were able to speak to the mischievous and bloodthirsty shade Amel. Amel grew to love Mekare, becoming her familiar. In time, soldiers sent by Akasha, Queen of Egypt, burned their village and captured the two witches. Coveting their knowledge and power, the Queen imprisoned and tortured the witches for some time; this infuriated the spirit of Amel, who began to haunt Akasha's villages and her nobles.

In time, as Akasha's own treacherous noblemen conspired against her and instigated both her murder and that of her husband, King Enkil, the spirit of Amel infused into her body as she lay dying. The shade's power and bloodlust roused her from death – reborn as the first immortal. After siring her spouse as well, Akasha and Enkil became known as the Divine Parents. To punish the twins for standing against her, the Queen had Maharet's eyes torn out and Mekare's tongue severed. Before they were to be executed, the steward Khayman sired them both out of pity.

Together they formed the First Brood and stood against the Divine Parents and their followers, the Queen's Blood. Overwhelmed and captured, the twins were separated and sent into exile; Maharet to familiar lands in the Red Sea, and Mekare to uncharted waters out towards the west. After two millennia, the Queen and King went mute and catatonic. They were maintained like statues by elders and priests under the impression that if Akasha – the host of Amel, the Sacred Core – died, all vampires would die with her. As the Common Era arrived, most undead forgot.

As years passed, the story of the Divine Parents were maintained by a few elders who barely believed it themselves. Despite this, many of the self-made blood gods – vampires from Akasha's earlier progeny – remained entombed in hollowed-out trees or brick cells where they starved. Early in the Common Era, the elder who was entrusted to keep the Parents abandoned Akasha and Enkil in the desert to wait for the sun to rise and consume them. While they remained unharmed, young vampires everywhere were destroyed by fire and even mighty elders were badly burned.

Following this, the fledgling Marius – a gifted Roman scholar – went to Egypt and retrieved the Divine Parents, making them his sacred responsibility as the new keeper. Over the course of nearly two millennia, they came to be known in legends as Marius and Those Who Must Be Kept. At some point in time, Maharet returned to her village on Mount Carmel in the guise of a distant family member. She returned periodically over the course of many centuries to keep a record of her descendants, all the way down to Jesse Reeves – one of the last of the Great Family.

=== Characteristics ===
Rice's vampires differ in many ways from their traditional counterparts such as Dracula. They are unaffected by crucifixes, garlic, a stake through the heart, or holy water. Ancient immortals are almost completely unaffected by the sun. The key trait of Rice's vampires is that they are unusually emotional and sensual, prone to aesthetic thinking. This lends well to artistic pursuits such as painting, writing, and singing; all of which are refined by their eidetic memory and heightened beauty.

Beyond their refined physical features, Rice's vampires are unique in that their appearance is more statue-like than human. Their pupils are luminous while in the dark and their nails appear more like glass. Being undead, their skin is likewise pallid as well as unusually smooth. Additionally, upon being sired, the vampire's body is essentially frozen in the state in which it died. Their hair and nails cease to grow; if they are cut, they will quickly grow back. The undead also possess no bodily fluids other than blood, as they are purged following death.

While virtually all other internal bodily functions expire, Rice's vampires still possess a noticeable heartbeat – albeit considerably slower than that of a living heart. This ensures normal blood circulation and also synchronizes with that of their fledglings while turning them. When vampires enter a state of hibernation, their hearts cease to beat and they enter into a desiccated state in which their bodies become skeletal and dry from lack of blood flow. Blood starvation may also trigger this. Removing their heart from their bodies will also kill them.

Despite these differences, Rice's undead do share some similarities with mainstream vampire fiction. They are supernaturally strong and can move faster than the eye can see. Their senses are heightened to the point where they can see clearly in total darkness and they will heal from any injury short of beheading as well as reattach limbs and remain unaffected by diseases or poisons. The act of feeding is highly sexualized in Rice's novels. Vampires both crave and need blood to sustain their unlife. While they can feed on animals, human blood is more nourishing. As they age, they're able to resist the urge more to the point where elders feed only for pleasure.

As with most vampire fiction, all of the undead were originally human. To sire a fledgling, a maker must feed upon a victim to the point of death. The attacker must then offer their own blood for the mortal to drink. After their body expires, they resurrect as a newborn immortal. Fledglings retain all the memories and mannerisms they had in life, however these usually fade or change over time as they acclimate to their new existence. Many young vampires experience existential crises or crippling depression as they learn to cope with their isolated nature.

==== Vampire Gifts ====
Within Rice's mythology, vampires possess certain paranormal abilities known as gifts. For younger undead, these gifts usually manifest in subtle ways. For older immortals – particularly ancient ones – these manifest as potent displays of both magic and their own inhuman natures. As vampires age, they become both stronger as well as more unnatural and statuesque in their appearance. Their demeanor usually becomes more tempered and calculating, even moreso as their more potent gifts manifest; which further distances them from their former human sentiments.

- Cloud Gift – This gift is proprietary to older undead. This power encompasses both levitation and eventually flight; allowing the immortal to ride wind currents high into the air or across long distances as well as adhere to sheer surfaces. Some prefer not to use it due to its inhuman nature. The precise time at which a vampire may develop this potent gift is uncertain. Some elders aren't aware that they even possess it, while all ancient ones are certain to use it at some point. Some speculate that the desire to fly is a contributing factor to manifesting this power.
- Fire Gift – This is the ability to set objects alight through sheer pyrokinetic will, so long as they maintain eye contact to direct their focus. This is another gift exclusive to older vampires and ancients, allowing them to set even other immortals aflame by igniting their flammable blood. Like other such powers, it's uncertain when exactly this gift manifests in a vampire. Fledglings sired by considerably older immortals may begin developing this ability from a very young age due to the raw potency of their maker's blood. Feeding on old undead may also trigger it.
- Mind Gift – This gift is present even in fledglings and encompasses the powers of both telepathy and telekinesis. A vampire may read the thoughts of others even while asleep, as well as project their own thoughts into others or exert their will onto physical objects such as doors or engines. As they become elders, vampires slowly learn how to mentally strip information from humans against their will and later how to send out a psychokinetic blast that can rupture the brain and blood cells of mortals and undead alike, so long as they maintain visual contact for focus.
- Spell Gift – This gift is active even in fledglings, albeit to a lesser degree as many have yet to learn how to use it properly. Rooted in eye-to-eye contact, this gift is a form of hypnosis which allows the vampire to persuade a mortal of something. Older undead can even beguile younger ones. Although this power cannot compel victims to do something against their will, it does allow a skilled vampire to erase memories as well as fabricate new ones. Due to its cerebral nature, it is ineffective from a distance. Many undead believe this power is rooted in the Mind Gift.

=== Society ===
The series creates its own terminology: vampires call the transfer of vampirism to a human the "Dark Gift", and refer to the vampire bestowing it as the "maker" and the new vampire as a "fledgling". In ancient times vampires formed a religion-like cult, and in the Middle Ages, believing themselves cursed, dwelt in catacombs under cemeteries in covens which emphasized darkness and their own cursed state.

Vampires are largely solitary; Lestat's "family" of 80 years is described as unusually long. There is no organized society beyond covens, religious bodies, and small groups from time to time. While a few vampires seem to find a way to cope with immortality, most capitulate to self-destructive anger or depression and do not survive beyond some decades or a few centuries. This is described in the series by the saying that vampires "go into the fire or go into history"—the few that survive far longer become legendary or semi-mythical characters. The most ancient vampires, a thousand or more years old, are known colloquially as "Children of the Millennia". In his life as a vampire, Lestat spends decades trying to find any vampire who is more than a few hundred years old, as a way to learn where they all came from and what their vampiric status means, a quest that eventually leads him to the 2000-year-old Marius.

== Themes and impact ==
In 2008, Rice called her vampires a "metaphor for lost souls", adding that "they were metaphors for us ... these were wonderful ways of writing about all our dilemmas in life... for me, supernatural characters were the way to talk about life; they were a way to talk about reality, actually." She also noted that writing about them had been, to her, "a sort of search for God and a kind of grief for a lost faith."

The homoerotic overtones of The Vampire Chronicles are also well-documented. Susan Ferraro of The New York Times wrote that "Gay readers see in the vampires' lonely, secretive search for others of their kind a metaphor for the homosexual experience." In 1996, Rice commented:

On the homoerotic content of my novels: I can only say what I have said many times—that no form of love between consenting individuals appears wrong to me. I see bisexuality as power. When I write I have no gender. It is difficult for me to see the characters in terms of gender. I have written individuals who can fall in love with men and women. All this feels extremely natural to me. Undoubtedly, there is a deep protest in me against the Roman Catholic attitude toward sexuality.

She said later in 2008:

My characters have always been transcending gender ... I think the main issue with me is love, not gender. I have never understood the great prejudice against gay people in our society ... I don't know why I see the world that way, but I know that it's very much a point with me, that we should not be bound by prejudices where gender is concerned.

In his book Anne Rice and Sexual Politics: The Early Novels, James R. Keller asserts that the publication and success of Rice's Vampire Chronicles reinforced the "widely recognized parallel between the queer and the vampire." He notes that in particular "gay and lesbian readers have been quick to identify with the representation of the vampire, suggesting its experiences parallel those of the sexual outsider." Richard Dyer discusses the recurring homoerotic motifs of vampire fiction in his article "Children of the Night", primarily "the necessity of secrecy, the persistence of a forbidden passion, and the fear of discovery."

== Reception ==
As of November 2008, The Vampire Chronicles had sold 80 million copies worldwide.

== Adaptations ==
=== Film ===
Interview with the Vampire was released in November 1994 starring Tom Cruise as Lestat, Brad Pitt as Louis, Kirsten Dunst as Claudia and Antonio Banderas as Armand.

A second film, Queen of the Damned, which combined plot elements of The Vampire Lestat and The Queen of the Damned, was released in 2002 starring Stuart Townsend as Lestat and Aaliyah as Akasha.

In August 2014, Universal Pictures and Imagine Entertainment acquired the motion picture rights to the entire Vampire Chronicles series, with producers Alex Kurtzman and Roberto Orci signed to helm the potential film franchise. The deal also included a screenplay for The Tale of the Body Thief (1992) adapted by Christopher Rice, Anne Rice's son. In May 2016, writer–director Josh Boone posted a photo on Instagram of the cover a script written by him and Jill Killington. Titled Interview with the Vampire, it is based on the novel of the same name and its sequel, The Vampire Lestat.

=== Television ===
In November 2016, Rice announced on Facebook that the rights to her novels were reverted to her despite earlier plans for other adaptations. Rice said that she and her son Christopher would be developing and executive producing a potential television series based on the novels. In April 2017, they teamed up with Paramount Television and Anonymous Content to develop a series. As of early 2018, Bryan Fuller was involved with the creation of a potential TV series based on the novels. On July 17, 2018, it was announced that the series was in development at streaming service Hulu and that Fuller had departed the production. As of December 2019, Hulu's rights had expired and Rice was shopping a package including all film and TV rights to the series. In May 2020, it was announced that AMC had acquired the rights to The Vampire Chronicles and Lives of the Mayfair Witches for developing film and television projects. Anne and Christopher Rice would serve as executive producers on any projects developed. In June 2021, it was announced that AMC had given a series order for Interview with the Vampire, an eight-episode television adaptation of the novel. The project is executive produced by Rolin Jones and Mark Johnson. The series premiered on AMC on October 2, 2022, starring Jacob Anderson as Louis, and Sam Reid as Lestat. Interview with the Vampire was renewed for an eight-episode second season in September 2022, ahead of its premiere on AMC. In June 2024, the series was renewed for a third season.

Interview with the Vampire has received critical acclaim, and is the first television series in Rice's Immortal Universe, based on the works of Anne Rice, with the second entry being the television adaptation of Lives of the Mayfair Witches.
