= Louis de Pointe du Lac =

Fictional character created by Anne Rice

- The Vampire Chronicles character
- Brad Pitt as Louis (1994)
- First appearance: Interview with the Vampire (1976)
- Last appearance: Blood Communion: A Tale of Prince Lestat (2018)
- Created by: Anne Rice
- Portrayed by: Brad Pitt (1994 film); Jim Stanek (2006 musical); Jacob Anderson (2022 TV series)

In-universe information
- Nicknames: Merciful Death; Dark Angel; Beautiful One
- Species: Vampire
- Gender: Male
- Family: Father, mother, younger sister, and brother Paul (younger brother)
- Spouse: Lestat de Lioncourt
- Children: Claudia (adoptive daughter)
- Religion: Catholic (as a human)
- Nationality: American (Louisiana Creole); French (born in France and emigrated to America)

Louis de Pointe du Lac is a fictional character in Anne Rice's The Vampire Chronicles series. He is the protagonist who tells his story in the first novel of the series, Interview with the Vampire. He begins his life as a mortal man in the 1700s and later becomes a vampire.

== Publication history ==
Louis is introduced in Rice's 1976 novel Interview with the Vampire which was to become the first novel in The Vampire Chronicles series. In the first novel he is the protagonist, where he explains his full backstory prior to transformation living in New Orleans as a plantation owner via oral retelling. Throughout the series, Louis becomes a secondary character and primary love interest to Lestat de Lioncourt.

=== Character development ===
Louis' creation began in the 1960s, where Rice had written a loose short story with him as the protagonist. In his early development, Rice felt that the creation of the character was her surrender to the guilt she'd felt towards her daughter's death. Quoting "When a child dies, you feel as if you should have been able to do something.'' Rice decided to not use Louis as a primary character during the rest of the series because she didn't self-identify with him any longer, feeling closer to Lestat instead.

== Fictional character biography ==
=== Physical appearance ===
During the first interview, Louis is described as having bright green eyes with a bleached face and medium length black hair which curls at the ends. He is described as wearing a long cape, with a white-collared shirt, and black silk tie during the interview. In the book The Vampire Armand, Armand describes Louis as human in appearance because of his voice and lack of supernatural prowess. He also states that Louis has long and delicate fingers. Throughout the series, Louis' clothing becomes more frayed.

=== History ===
Louis de Pointe du Lac is born in France on October 4, 1766, to a Roman Catholic family who emigrated to North America when he was very young. His mother, sister and brother, Paul, live just outside New Orleans on one of their two indigo plantations, named Pointe du Lac after the family. Louis' brother, who insists that he has religious visions, dies after a terrible quarrel with Louis. Louis blames himself for his brother's death, becoming self-destructive, cynical, and desperate. He longs for the release of death, but lacks the courage to commit suicide. He takes to frequenting taverns and other places of ill repute, instigating fights and duels in order that someone might kill him.

During an incident in a tavern, Louis catches the eye of the vampire Lestat de Lioncourt. Lestat appears to Louis as an angel and offers him an alternative to his desperate, meaningless life. Lestat, upon seeing for the first time Louis's "fine black hair" and deep green eyes, and sensing his passion, is seduced not only by Louis's beauty, but also by his tragedy and human heart; "He seduced the tenderness in me." Lestat makes Louis into a vampire at the age of 25, his immortal companion in 1791, and lives with Louis for nearly 70 years.

However, Lestat is damaged from his experiences in France and the Old World. He is not as gentle a tutor or as much of a friend as Louis would like, one of the central themes in Interview with the Vampire. An example of this is an anguished comment recalled by Louis in his memoir, where he muses: "I was thinking how sublime friendship between Lestat and me might have been; how few impediments to it there would have been, and how much to be shared."

While Louis and Lestat are often at odds with one another, they eventually form an uneasy truce, with Lestat coming to regard Louis as a kind of soulmate, albeit one who resists his "teachings" on killing and living life as a vampire.

Interview with the Vampire details an ersatz familial relationship between Louis, Lestat and a third vampire, Claudia. Louis, in a moment of weakness, feeds from a five-year-old orphan he finds in an abandoned house within the plague-ridden section of New Orleans. Lestat contrives to make her into a vampire to, in his own words, "bind Louis to [him]." In giving Louis Claudia to love and look after, he curses Claudia by condemning her to the form of a little girl.

Louis accepts his "family", taking the "maternal" role with Claudia and finding contentment in their townhouse at Rue Royale. Claudia, however, matures psychologically but remains in her child form. After decades of being trapped in the form of a small child, she comes to hate both of her "parents" for giving her immortality. She rebels against Lestat, poisoning him and setting their home ablaze with Lestat inside in 1860. She escapes with Louis to eastern Europe to look for other vampires. After years of searching and becoming disillusioned, they travel to Paris.

In Paris, they find fifteen vampires who have disguised themselves as human actors pretending to be vampires at the Théâtre des Vampires. However, in the eyes of this coven of vampires, Louis and Claudia are criminals. The coven finds out that both attempted to kill their maker Lestat, and believe they ought to pay for their crime with their lives since killing fellow vampires is against the rules of the vampiric lifestyle. Louis escapes death after Lestat pleads for his life. Claudia is exposed to the sun and destroyed.

Louis burns down the Théâtre, killing the vampires there as revenge for Claudia's death and drifts through the world with the Theatre's former leader, Armand, whom he had fallen in love with. They separate in the late 1970s in New Orleans.

In the early 1920s, Louis claims to have discovered Lestat in New Orleans, lost in a catatonic state. Louis turns his back on him in pity and disgust. (This may be a fabrication by Louis to lead Daniel to Lestat's haunt, on which Lestat remarks in his memoir, "Louis [...] had all but drawn a map and placed an X on the very spot in New Orleans where I slumbered [...] and what his intentions were, were not clear." Lestat also mentions, in The Tale of the Body Thief, that Louis "made up" this scene. In The Vampire Lestat, Lestat does not mention meeting Louis again in New Orleans before undertaking his long sleep.)

Louis and Lestat are reunited at the end of the novel The Vampire Lestat in 1985 when Lestat is a rock superstar. In the events of The Queen Of The Damned, Louis and other vampires come together at Maharet's house in the Sonoma Compound to fight against Akasha. In the novel's epilogue, Louis and Lestat travel to London and begin to restore their companionship.

In Tale of the Body Thief, Louis is revealed to be living in a cottage behind a decaying mansion in New Orleans. When Lestat, who has been tricked into exchanging bodies with a mortal man, begs Louis to turn his new body into a vampire Louis refuses out of jealousy that Lestat gets to live as a human. Lestat burns down his cottage in retaliation. In the novel's epilogue the two make peace, move back to their Rue Royale townhouse together and agree to travel with David Talbot, Lestat's new companion.

Louis is one of the only vampires to refuse the powerful blood offered by Maharet and Lestat, preferring to gain strength with age. However at the end of Merrick, one of the Vampire Chronicles, Louis puts himself into the sun after making Merrick a vampire. Lestat, David Talbot, and Merrick then give Louis some of their blood (Lestat and David's containing the power of some of the oldest and most powerful vampires in the world) to save Louis's life. It is noted by David Talbot that with this transfusion of blood Louis may have lost some of his humanity and become more vampiric in nature and has become almost equal to Lestat in power.

In Prince Lestat and the Realms of Atlantis, Louis leaves Armand and his home at Trinity Gate to reunite with Lestat, who has now taken up the role as leader of the vampire tribe. Lestat requests Louis return with him to the chateau in France as his companion and confidante; Louis agrees and becomes consort to Lestat, taking an active role in solving the dilemma the tribe face in that novel.

== Fledglings ==
- Madeleine
- Merrick Marie Louise Mayfair

== Appearances in other media ==
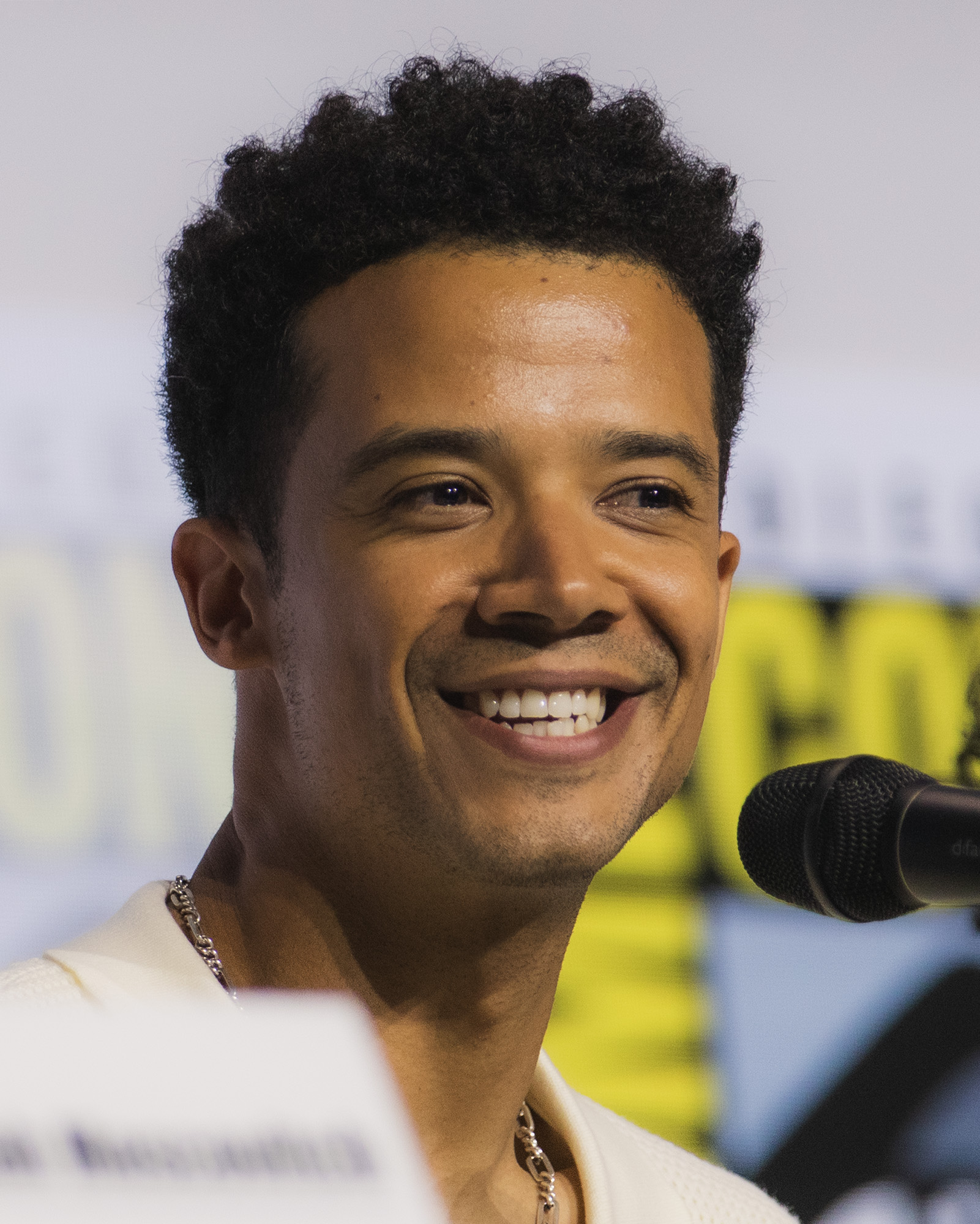
Jacob Anderson portrays Louis in the 2022 TV series Interview with the Vampire.

In Neil Jordan's 1994 film adaptation of Interview with the Vampire, Louis is portrayed by Brad Pitt. Despite largely sticking to the events of the book, this version of the character is presented as having lost his pregnant wife and child before being turned by Lestat rather than his brother like in the book.

Louis is absent from Michael Rymer's 2002 film adaptation of The Queen of the Damned, despite appearing in the book. His role as Lestat's love interest, and later his companion in the epilogue, is instead filled by Jesse Reeves (played by Marguerite Moreau).

Louis appeared as the character in the short-lived Broadway show Lestat: The Musical composed by Elton John and Bernie Taupin, and was played by Jim Stanek.

Jacob Anderson portrays Louis in the 2022 television series by AMC. His backstory is radically altered in the show, changing him from a sexually ambiguous white slave owner from the 18th century to a gay closeted black brothel owner in the early 20th century, with more focus given towards his psyche and relationships with Armand, Lestat and Daniel Molloy.
