= Interview with the Vampire =

1976 novel by Anne Rice

- First edition cover
- Author: Anne Rice
- Language: English
- Series: The Vampire Chronicles
- Genre: Gothic horror, vampire
- Published: May 5, 1976
- Publisher: Knopf
- Publication place: United States
- Media type: Print (hardcover, paperback)
- Pages: 369 (hardcover); 342 (paperback)
- ISBN: 0-394-49821-6
- OCLC: 2132415
- Followed by: The Vampire Lestat

Interview with the Vampire is a gothic horror and vampire novel by American author Anne Rice, published in 1976. It was her debut novel. Based on a short story Rice wrote around 1968, the novel centers on vampire Louis de Pointe du Lac, who tells the story of his life to a reporter. Rice composed the novel shortly after the death of her young daughter Michele, who served as an inspiration for the child-vampire character Claudia.

Though initially the subject of mixed critical reception, the book was followed by many widely popular sequels, collectively known as The Vampire Chronicles.

A film adaptation was released in 1994 and a television series premiered in 2022. The novel has also been adapted as a comic three times.

== Plot summary ==
A vampire named Louis de Pointe du Lac tells his 200-year-long life story to a reporter referred to simply as "the boy".

In 1791, Louis is the young master of a large indigo plantation in colonial Louisiana. Distraught by the death of his younger brother Paul, he begins drunkenly wandering the streets at night, hoping to be murdered. One night, he is approached by a vampire named Lestat de Lioncourt, who senses Louis' despair. Concluding that the loss of his humanity will free him from grief, he accepts Lestat's offer to become his companion and is turned into a vampire.

Louis initially perceives Lestat as an extraordinary being, but is disillusioned after joining him as a vampire, as he realizes Lestat has no special moral insights and is in fact not much older than Louis himself. Lestat's elderly father moves to the plantation, and Louis learns a few details about Lestat's boyhood, including that he was denied an education and that his father once considered him the gentlest of his brothers.

Lestat spends time feeding off slaves, thieves, and other plantation families, while Louis, who finds it immoral to murder humans, drinks the less potent blood of animals. Louis' slaves begin to suspect him, and Louis and Lestat realize they cannot remain. Lestat's father attempts to apologize for the abuse he inflicted on Lestat as a child, but Lestat remains unforgiving and asks Louis to kill his father before they depart.

Louis sets his own plantation aflame; he and Lestat kill the slaves to keep word from spreading about vampires in Louisiana. Gradually, Louis bends under Lestat's influence and begins feeding from humans. He slowly accepts his vampirism but also becomes increasingly repulsed by what he perceives as Lestat's total lack of compassion for humans.

Escaping to New Orleans, Louis feeds off a plague-ridden, five-year-old girl, found next to the corpse of her mother. Louis begins to think of leaving Lestat. Fearing this, Lestat then turns the girl into a vampire "daughter" for them, to give Louis a reason to stay. She is then given the name Claudia.

Louis is initially horrified that Lestat has turned a child into a vampire, but soon begins to care for Claudia. Claudia takes to killing easily but soon realizes she can never grow up; her mind matures into that of a woman, but her body remains that of a young girl.

Claudia blames Lestat for her state and, after 60 years, hatches a plot to kill Lestat. Claudia and Louis then dump his body into a nearby swamp. As Louis and Claudia prepare to flee to Europe, Lestat appears, having recovered from Claudia's attack, and confronts them. Louis sets fire to their home and barely escapes with Claudia, leaving Lestat to burn.

Arriving in Europe, Louis and Claudia seek out other vampires. They travel throughout Eastern Europe first and encounter some, but these vampires appear to be nothing more than mindless, animated corpses. Louis begins to regret the murder of Lestat, fearing that they may have killed the one vampire who could provide answers regarding their nature. It is only when they reach Paris that they encounter vampires like themselves, meeting the 400-year-old vampire Armand and his coven at the Théâtre des Vampires.

Inhabiting an ancient theater, Armand and his vampire coven disguise themselves as humans and feed on terrified humans in mock plays before a live audience (thinking the killings are a performance). Claudia is repulsed, but Louis and Armand are drawn to each other.

Fearing that Louis will leave her for Armand, Claudia convinces Louis to turn a Parisian doll maker, Madeleine, into a vampire to serve as a replacement companion for her. Louis, Madeleine, and Claudia live together for a brief time, but all three are abducted one night by Armand's coven.

It is revealed that Lestat survived the fire in New Orleans, scarred and weakened. He demands that Claudia face punishment, even death, for her murder attempt but screams at the coven that they promised not to harm Louis. Ignoring Lestat, the coven proceeds with its punishments. Louis is forcibly locked in a coffin to starve, while Claudia and Madeleine are entrapped in an open courtyard.

Armand arrives and releases Louis, but Madeleine and Claudia are burned to death by the sun; a devastated Louis finds their ashen remains. Louis sees Lestat crying over the remnants of Claudia's yellow dress but loses track of him as he plots his revenge against the coven.

Louis returns to the Theatre late the following night, burning it to the ground and killing all the vampires inside, leaving with Armand. Together, the two travel across Europe for several years, but Louis never fully recovers from Claudia's death, and his relationship with Armand becomes strained. It remains ambiguous even to Louis whether the murder of Claudia was primarily orchestrated by Armand to gain Louis's companionship, by the coven believing Claudia broke ancient vampire law, or by Lestat's desire for vengeance.

Tired of the Old World, Louis returns to New Orleans in the early 20th century. Living as a loner, he feeds off any humans who cross his path, but lives in the shadows, never creating another companion for himself.

Louis tells the boy of one last encounter with Lestat in New Orleans, where Lestat has hidden himself in a rotting mansion and lost touch with the passing of time. Armand hopes that seeing Lestat might arouse feelings of passion, sorrow, or anger in Louis and expresses despair that Louis remains cold and unable to share eternity with him. They end their companionship, with nothing more to offer one another. Louis ends his tale, revealing that after 200 years, he is weary of immortality and the chaos he has created.

The boy, however, seeing only the great powers granted to a vampire, begs to be made into one himself. Angry that his interviewer learned nothing, Louis refuses, attacking him and vanishing. The boy leaves to track down Lestat, hoping to receive immortality.

== Background and publication ==
In 1970, while Anne Rice was attending a graduate program in Creative Writing at San Francisco State University, her daughter Michele, then about four years old, was diagnosed with acute granulocytic leukemia. Michele died of the illness about two years later, and Rice fell into a deep depression, turning to alcohol in order to cope. Later reviewers and commentators identified Michele as an inspiration for the character of Claudia.

In 1973, while still grieving the loss of her daughter, Rice began reworking a previously written short story, which she had written in 1968 or 1969. (Note: Biographer Katherine Ramsland gives two dates for the short story: 1968 in the text, and 1969 in her timeline of Rice's life. Michael Riley's timeline lists the year as 1969.) Thirty pages long, the short story was written from the interviewer's perspective. She decided to expand "Interview with the Vampire" into a novel at the encouragement of one of her husband's students, who enjoyed her writing. It took her five weeks to complete the 338-page novel: she did research on vampires during the day and often wrote during the night.

After completing the novel and following many rejections from publishers, Rice developed obsessive–compulsive disorder (OCD). She became obsessed with germs, thinking that she contaminated everything she touched, engaged in frequent and obsessive hand washing and obsessively checked locks on windows and doors. Of this period, Rice says: "What you see when you're in that state is every single flaw in our hygiene and you cannot control it and you go crazy".

In August 1974, Rice attended the Community of Writers Conference in Olympic Valley, conducted by writer Ray Nelson. While at the conference, she met her future literary agent, Phyllis Seidel. In October 1974, Seidel sold the publishing rights to Interview with the Vampire to Alfred A. Knopf for a $12,000 advance of the hardcover rights, at a time when most new authors were receiving $2,000 advances. Interview with the Vampire was published in April 1976. In 1977, the Rices traveled to both Europe and Egypt for the first time.

Upon its release, Interview with the Vampire received mixed reviews from critics. A reviewer for the St. Louis Post-Dispatch gave the book a positive review, describing the prose as "hypnotically poetic in tone, rich in sensory imagery", while other reviews were more negative. Edith Milton of The New Republic wrote: "To pretend that it has any purpose beyond suckling eroticism is rank hypocrisy". Leo Braudy writing for The New York Times said: "[...] the book is too superficial, too impersonal and too obviously made, to touch the sources of real terror and feeling." As of February 2008, the novel had sold 8 million copies worldwide.

The book spawned a total of twelve sequels, collectively known as The Vampire Chronicles, and the spin-off series New Tales of the Vampires. The first sequel, The Vampire Lestat, was published in 1985 and sold more than 75,000 copies in its first printing, garnering largely favorable reviews. 1988's The Queen of the Damned improved on Lestat's numbers, receiving an initial hardcover run of 405,000 and topping the New York Times Best Seller list. Rice's vampire books share a fictional universe with her series Lives of the Mayfair Witches and the novel The Mummy, or Ramses the Damned.

== Adaptations ==
=== Film ===
The film rights to Interview were at times controlled by Paramount Pictures, Lorimar, and Warner Bros., the distributor of the film, before The Geffen Film Company acquired the rights. Director Neil Jordan rewrote Rice's first draft of the screenplay, though she received sole credit. Brad Pitt starred as Louis, Tom Cruise starred as Lestat, Antonio Banderas co-starred as Armand, as did a young Kirsten Dunst as the child vampire Claudia. Most of the movie's shooting had been completed by October 1993, and all that remained were the few scenes involving the interviewer that would then be inserted at various points throughout the film. Production of those scenes was put on hold for a few weeks whilst River Phoenix, who had been cast as the interviewer, finished working on the film Dark Blood. Phoenix died from an overdose later that month, and Christian Slater was then cast as the interviewer Molloy. Slater donated his entire salary to Earth Save and Earth Trust, two of Phoenix's favorite charities.

The film was released in November 1994 to generally positive critical reaction, and received Academy Award nominations for Best Art Direction and Best Original Score. Dunst was nominated for a Golden Globe for Best Supporting Actress for her role in the film. Rice had initially voiced her objections to the casting of Cruise as Lestat, preferring Rutger Hauer for the role. After seeing the film, however, she voiced her support for the casting decision, saying: "That Tom did make Lestat work was something I could not see in a crystal ball. It's to his credit that he proved me wrong".

In August 2014, Universal Pictures and Imagine Entertainment acquired the motion picture rights to the entire Vampire Chronicles series, with producers Alex Kurtzman and Roberto Orci signed to helm the potential film franchise. The deal also included a screenplay for The Tale of the Body Thief (1992) adapted by Christopher Rice. In May 2016, writer-director Josh Boone posted a photo on Instagram of the cover a script written by him and Jill Killington. Titled Interview with the Vampire, it is based on the novel of the same name and its sequel, The Vampire Lestat. However, that November Universal did not renew the contract, and the film and television rights reverted to Rice, who began developing the Vampire Chronicles into a television series with Christopher.

=== Comics ===
Innovation Comics published a twelve-issue comic book adaptation of Interview with the Vampire from 1991 to 1994, also making comic adaptations of The Vampire Lestat (12 issues) and The Queen of the Damned (11 issues). A Japanese manga adaptation by Udou Shinohara was published in 1994 by Tokuma Shoten. It was also serialized in both Animage and Chara magazines. In 2012, the graphic novel Interview with the Vampire: Claudia's Story was published by Yen Press, retelling much of the original novel from the point of view of child vampire Claudia.

=== Television ===
In May 2020, AMC acquired the rights to The Vampire Chronicles and Lives of the Mayfair Witches for developing film and television projects. AMC gave the production a series order for a seven episode first season of Interview with the Vampire. The series is executive produced by Rolin Jones and Mark Johnson. Interview with the Vampire stars Jacob Anderson as Louis, Sam Reid as Lestat, Bailey Bass/Delainey Hayles as Claudia, and Assad Zaman as Rashid/Armand. The series premiered on October 2, 2022. The novel is adapted through the first two seasons, with elements from The Vampire Lestat being used during season two and being the basis for season three.
