= Blood Canticle =

2003 novel by Anne Rice

- First edition cover
- Author: Anne Rice
- Audio read by: David Pittu
- Cover artist: Cumaean Sibyl by Domenichino
- Language: English
- Series: The Vampire Chronicles; The Mayfair Witches
- Genre: Horror
- Published: October 28, 2003
- Publisher: Knopf
- Publication place: United States
- Media type: Print (Hardcover)
- Pages: 320
- ISBN: 0-375-41200-X
- OCLC: 51020425
- Dewey Decimal: 813/.54 21
- LC Class: PS3568.I265 B63 2003
- Preceded by: Blackwood Farm
- Followed by: Prince Lestat

Blood Canticle is a 2003 vampire novel by American writer Anne Rice, the tenth book in her The Vampire Chronicles series. The novel includes some characters who cross over from Rice's Lives of the Mayfair Witches trilogy (1990–1994), concluding the unified story begun in Merrick (2000) and continued in Blackwood Farm (2002).

Blood Canticle was originally intended to conclude the saga of Rice's famed vampire Lestat de Lioncourt, but in March 2014 she announced a sequel titled Prince Lestat.

== Plot summary ==
Narrated by the vampire Lestat de Lioncourt, Blood Canticle finds young Mayfair witch and heiress Mona slowly dying, afflicted with a mysterious disease brought on by the birth of her daughter Morrigan. Over time, Mona and her guardian, Rowan Mayfair, reveal more and more about the powerful genetic plague that has haunted the Mayfairs for generations: their connection to the Taltos, an advanced species of human to which both women have given birth. Mona and the young vampire Tarquin "Quinn" Blackwood are in love. Lestat turns a dying Mona into a vampire so that the lovers can be together forever.

While trying to prevent Mona's family from discovering her transformation, Lestat falls in love with the married Rowan, and she secretly pines for him as well. As Mona adjusts to her new power, Lestat enlists the ancient vampire Maharet to help find Mona's Taltos child. Lestat, Quinn and Mona arrive at the remote island colony of the Taltos, but instead of finding a secluded utopia, they discover that years of criminal intrigue and civil war have taken their toll. The remaining Taltos join the Mayfair clan at the Mayfair Medical Center where they intend to safely learn and grow as a family. Mona and Quinn are instructed in the proper ways of vampirism by Maharet and her twin Mekare. Rowan seeks out Lestat, half in love with him but torn by her love for her husband Michael. Exhausted by her life, she requests that he make her a vampire. Lestat declines, pained though he is, because she is a guiding force for the Mayfair family and he cannot take her away from it.

== Crossovers ==
Some characters from Rice's Lives of the Mayfair Witches trilogy (1990–1994) appear in Merrick (2000), and later Blackwood Farm (2002) and Blood Canticle.

== Audiobooks ==
In 2003, Penguin Random House Audio released an abridged audiobook adaptation of Blood Canticle, narrated by Stephen Spinella, as well as an unabridged version, narrated by David Pittu.

== Critical reception ==
Blood Canticle debuted at No. 5 on The New York Times Best Seller list, spending a total of five weeks on the list. Publishers Weekly wrote, "The vampirization of young Mona, a true child of our times, gives Rice a dynamic new vampire personality with whom to play. Writing as if her blood-inked quill were afire, Rice seems truly possessed by [Lestat] as she races through the story. She sometimes slights members of the vast supporting cast, both dead and alive, but neatly ties up all their loose ends." Alynda Wheat of Entertainment Weekly called Blood Canticle "overwrought and pulpy as only Rice knows how to be", adding that "while he occasionally displays the flashes of vanity, wit, and style that originally lured fans, Lestat is lately hampered with a desire to be (ick!) good. It's a moral U-turn that drives the Blood Hunter toward the ultimate literary sin: tedium."

After Blood Canticle received many "virulently negative reviews" from readers on Amazon.com, Rice responded on the site with "a blistering 1,200-word defense" of the novel. Compelled to speak out because many of the postings included personal attacks on her writing ability, health and state of mind since her husband's 2002 death, Rice added that she had received many emails of support from fellow writers who had also felt "savaged and trashed" by Amazon.com reviews.
