= Vittorio the Vampire =

1999 novel by Anne Rice

- First edition
- Author: Anne Rice
- Language: English
- Series: New Tales of the Vampires
- Genre: Horror fiction
- Published: March 16, 1999
- Publisher: Knopf
- Media type: Print (Hardcover, Paperback) & abridged audio book
- Pages: 304
- ISBN: 0-375-40160-1
- Preceded by: Pandora

Vittorio the Vampire (1999) is a vampire novel by American writer Anne Rice. It is one of two novels in the New Tales of the Vampires series, along with Pandora.

== Plot summary ==
In the twentieth century, from his castle in the northern part of Tuscany, Vittorio writes the tragic tale of his life.

In 1450, Vittorio di Raniari is a sixteen-year-old Italian nobleman, when his family is murdered by a powerful and ancient coven of vampires. The image of his siblings' severed heads with eyes staring fixedly at him strikes him permanently. Vittorio, however, escapes such a dreadful ending because of one of the vampires’ intervention. Her name is Ursula.

After taking care of his family's burial, Vittorio gathers what riches he can and prepares himself to seek vengeance on these monsters who killed his family.

By nightfall, Vittorio arrives at the walled city of Santa Maddalena. He talks his way into the gated city and seeks respite at a local inn. After retiring to bed, Ursula appears. She urges Vittorio to leave and to never speak of what happened to his family. All the while, Vittorio is torn by a conflict the beautiful Ursula has kindled within his soul. Part of him wants to kill her and exact his revenge, while another part of him burns with desire to have her. During this tryst, Ursula feeds on Vittorio, during which time he sees visions of them alone in a beautiful and peaceful flowered meadow that belongs only to them. And Ursula forces Vittorio to drink from her own self-inflicted wound, which causes the same fantastic visions he is powerless to resist.

The next day, Vittorio confesses to a priest and seeks absolution for his sins, along with help from the Dominicans to return home and help slay these demons. Much to Vittorio’s dismay, the priest offers no solace and demands that he leave this town and never speak of this to anyone. Vittorio then realizes that this poor damned priest is in league with the devil.

Vittorio is led by Ursula to the coven's lair, as she attempts to make him part of their gatherings. It is an ancient castle, where he discovers its many gardens filled with old people and sick children; he suddenly realizes that some of these people he had met at the village. Vittorio then witnesses an important feast that is carried on as a ritual by the leader of the vampires' group. In it, some people who were selected from the gardens are sacrificed to satisfy their thirst for blood.

After refusing the dark gift, the vampires do not kill him (thanks to Ursula), but rather leave him in a village. As he is walking, he sees two Angels arguing in a doorway, Ramiel and Setheus. The angels are just as surprised as he that Vittorio can see them (he later learns that they are the guardian angels of his idol, Fra Filippo Lippi). With their help, the help of his own angels, and a very powerful armor-wearing angel, Mastema, Vittorio plots his revenge against the vampires, who are invading the lands and killing innocents (incidentally, Vittorio's own guiding angels do not play much of a part; while they are often present, they are insubstantial and shadowy, and we do not know their names).

The attack takes place in the day and involves decapitating the vampires as they sleep. The heads are then thrown into the sunlight where they wither and die. When it comes time to behead Ursula, Vittorio finds that he cannot do this even as the angels urge him on. Instead, he frees Ursula in the hopes of saving her soul. Within minutes, Vittorio is tricked into becoming a vampire and a yearning for blood conquers everything he knows.

In the closing pages we find Ursula and Vittorio performing as an age old Bonnie and Clyde, killing and drinking until they had their fill. These two lovers stay with each other for many years to come.

Vittorio is unique in two ways: he can see angels and departing human souls. At the end of the book, he is left with the "gift" to see human souls, which appear from every person as an intense shining light. Mastema tells him that he will never be able to rid himself of this, and that every time he takes a human life he will bear witness to the extinguishing of the soul.

== Reception ==
H. Gregory Mitchell of The Free Lance–Star said the book has "A taut, finely crafted plot, shot through with lush imagery and compelling history [...]" Joanna Keating of Associated Press wrote: "While this second volume in the "New Tales of the Vampires" series falls short of Rice's novels about the vampire Lestat, it is nevertheless superbly written and engaging."

The novel reached number six on Publishers Weekly's list of national top 10 books.
