= Pandora (Rice novel) =

1998 novel by Anne Rice

- First edition
- Author: Anne Rice
- Language: English
- Series: New Tales of the Vampires
- Genre: Horror fiction
- Published: March 2, 1998
- Publisher: Knopf
- Publication place: United States
- Media type: Print (Hardcover, Paperback) & abridged audio book
- Pages: 368
- ISBN: 0-375-40159-8 (hardcover edition)
- OCLC: 37966504
- Dewey Decimal: 813/.54 21
- LC Class: PS3568.I265 P36 1998b
- Followed by: Vittorio the Vampire

Pandora (1998) is a vampire novel by American writer Anne Rice. It is one of two novels in the New Tales of the Vampires series, along with Vittorio the Vampire.

== Plot summary ==
Pandora was born with the name Lydia in the Roman Republic in the year 15 BC to a Senatorial family. She is tall, with rippling brown hair and gold-brown eyes. Like many Patrician Roman girls of the time Pandora was taught how to read and write and is well versed in epic poems, especially Ovid's works. She meets Marius for the first time when he is twenty-five and she is ten. Marius asks for Lydia's hand in marriage, but her father rejects Marius' offer. Five years later, Lydia sees Marius at a festival and begs her father to allow her to marry Marius. Her father again refuses.

Pandora's father holds a high rank as a Senator. But when a new emperor takes power, her family is betrayed by her own brother and killed. Only Pandora and her traitorous brother survive the massacre, and she is taken to Antioch (after changing her name) by a man who was very close to her father. There she meets Marius again, twenty years after their last encounter. Unbeknownst to her, Marius is now a vampire.

She eventually finds out what Marius has become, and also that he protects and hides the Queen and King of all Vampires. Another vampire, Akabar, wants to steal the Queen's powerful and ancient blood. Marius and Pandora try to prevent him from carrying out his plan. To gain access to the Queen, Akabar uses Marius's love for Pandora against him and drains Pandora to the point of death. In order to save her, Marius is forced to make Pandora into a vampire and forced to let Akabar see the Queen, who then destroys Akabar. The pair stay together for the next two hundred years, taking care of the King and Queen of all vampires, before arguing and separating. Marius later characterized the breakup (of which he left her and she spent six months or more waiting for him to return) as being entirely his fault: He considers himself a teacher who longs to impart what he knows upon his pupils, but Pandora—being as free-spirited and highly educated as she was—had no patience to be his student. During their time together, against his objection, she did turn one of her beloved slaves into a vampire. As soon as he was turned he left the pair and was not seen again.

The next time they meet again is in a Dresden ballroom in the early to late-17th century. Marius tries in vain to make Pandora leave her companion and fledgling, Arjun, and come back to him. Pandora's relationship with Arjun is of great concern to Marius, who fears Pandora is being held against her will. While she outwardly denies this, Pandora overcomes her embarrassment and admits to David in her writing that she could not bring herself to leave Arjun, citing that his stronger will propelled them both through time.

The next and last time that they meet is in 1985, when she is among thirteen vampires who survived Akasha's killing spree and gathered at Maharet's house in the Sonoma compound to battle against Akasha. Pandora remains quiet and withdrawn throughout the whole ordeal, staring out the windows and saying little, rousing herself only once to say that Akasha is trying to justify deplorable "reasons" for a holocaust.

Like many vampires, Pandora is a morose, despairing immortal who initially wanted immortality but soon regretted her choice and turns into a dark, indifferent cynic. Lestat thinks that Pandora was troubled in some deep, fundamental way even before she became a vampire, because she's the only vampire who does not receive visions of Maharet and Mekare in her dreams. During the confrontation in Sonoma, when Akasha directly asks Pandora to join with her or die, Pandora merely responds in a quiet, indifferent voice that she cannot do what Akasha is asking of her, and stoically accepts the idea of being killed.

Even after Akasha herself is destroyed and the thirteen vampires regroup in Armand's Night Island in Florida, Pandora still acts withdrawn from her fellow vampire kin, watching music videos all day long and ignores Marius, who dotes on her lovingly. There is no sense of recovery or security in her as there is with the other vampires, and she departs from Night Island alone, still just as morose as ever.

== Other novels ==
David Talbot encounters her in Paris shortly after the events of Memnoch the Devil and before the story of The Vampire Armand. He asks her to write the story of her life, which she does in a cafe by writing in some notebooks he gave her. She recalls the details of her life before becoming a vampire and briefly discusses the period when she was with Marius. After she has finished, she writes that she plans to go to New Orleans to look for Marius and to look into the eyes of Lestat, and try to understand what it is he saw. She is last seen at the end of Blood and Gold, alongside Marius.

Pandora is again seen in the novel Prince Lestat when she comes to confront Arjun of his burning fledglings and old ones in Mumbai after being told by "The Voice". There she meets Gremt Stryker Knollys, who confides in her that he is also searching for "The Voice". He also claims to be the founder of the Talamasca in the year 748, along with the vampire who created Marius and the ghost of a vampire that was just killed named Hesketh. Gremt is the spirit Pandora meets towards the end of her novel when the writer Cassiodorus dies.

== Reception ==
Publishers Weekly commended the author in a review writing "along the way, we find little of Rice's trademark eroticism, but Pandora has long been one of her more elusive characters, so fans will relish this vivid rendering of her life and times." Kirkus Reviews concluded: "This is Rice in top romantic form, despite a slippery page here and there." The New York Times wrote: "But despite a wealth of narrative twists and period detail, Pandora proves only sporadically convincing -- and occasionally downright inadequate."

The novel was number 50 on USA Today's list of best selling books.
