= Mastema =

Angel or evil angel in the Book of Jubilees

Mastema (Hebrew: מַשְׂטֵמָה Masṭēmā; Ge'ez: መሰቴማ Mesetēma), Mastemat, or Mansemat, is an antagonistic angel in the Book of Jubilees. He first appears in the literature of the Second Temple Period as a personification of the Hebrew word mastemah (מַשְׂטֵמָה), meaning "hatred", "hostility", "enmity", or "persecution".

In the Book of Jubilees, Mastema requests hosts of demons, the spirits of the Nephilim, from God to tempt and corrupt humanity. He appears to various prophets and puts them to the test. Throughout the work, Mastema substitutes evil actions attributed to Yahweh in the Torah and removes malice from the Godhead of the Hebrew tradition. Nevertheless, Mastema remains subordinate to the Godhead.

== Book of Jubilees ==
According to the Book of Jubilees, Mastema ("hostility") is the chief of the Nephilim, the demons engendered by the fallen angels called Watchers with human women.

Although leading a group of demons, the text implies that he is an angel working for God instead, as he does not fear imprisonment along with the Nephilim. Yet, the matter is blurred because angels and other kinds of spirits are not clearly differentiated in the work.

His function is similar to Satan in the Book of Job, as a servant of God. Another devilish entity, Belial, is mentioned twice in Jubilees and is probably identical to Mastema.

=== The story ===
According to the Book of Jubilees, Mastema requests permission from God to spare some of the giants (demons) and put them under his control (Jubilees 10:8). In Jubilees 11:10, Mastema is behind the birds mentioned in Genesis 15:11. At the time of Terah, Mastema sends ravens to eat and devour the seeds from the fields. It is Mastema who initiates the binding of Isaac and, by that, substitutes Yahweh. Likewise, not Yahweh but Mastema hardens the Pharaoh's heart (Jub. 48:15–17).

The account of Zipporah at the Inn where Yahweh meets Moses and tries to kill him is told in a way that attributes the attack to Mastema instead (Jubilees 48:1-3). Mastema is also said to have been chained while the Israelites left Egypt, but then let go to encourage the Egyptians to chase after the Israelites and so come to their doom in the Red Sea. The deaths of the firstborn of the Egyptians are attributed to "all the powers of Mastema". Mastema is also behind the powers of the Pharaoh's sorcerers.

=== Historical perspectives ===
The figure Mastema might be a step in developing the concept of the Devil as independent from God during the Second Temple period. By substituting Yahweh's malevolent role throughout the Torah with one of his angels, God is absolved of his otherwise evil actions. Yet, the authors of the Book of Jubilees assert that, ultimately, evil is caused by God, as it is God who explicitly grants Mastema demons. Accordingly, God allows evil to exist, but only for a limited period of time, without committing evil himself.

Although a prince of evil, Mastema never harms God's servants. Whenever Mastema acts, it is only by God's permission, or Mastema is immediately restrained. In cases when harm actually befalls God's people, Mastema is not associated with the act. Mastema and his demons only succeed when they attack a non-Israelite nation. Throughout the Book of Jubilees, God's loyalty to the people of Israel remains unshaken. Mastema might be understood as a figure of evil befalling the non-Israelite nations. As such, the text inverts the audience's expectations by nullifying the power of the agent of evil as long as they stay loyal to the Jewish tradition.

There are no parallel stories to that of Mastema and Abraham in later Jewish traditions. However, parallels are found between Mastema and Nimrod in Muḥammad al-Kisāʾī's Qisas al-Anbiya. In the Quran, Mastema's function is reflected in the figure Iblis, who likewise requests God to tempt humanity and receives hosts of demons in order to do so, and is subordinative to God, unable to harm God's servants.

== Dead Sea Scrolls ==
The name appears in the Dead Sea Scrolls. In the Damascus Document, the expression "angel of mastema" (mal'ak ha-mastema) occurs. The definite article ha- indicates that mastema is not a proper name here. The Serek ha-Yahad declares that God:

"made Belial for the pit, an angel of mastema; and in dark[ness is] his [rule] and in his counsel is to bring wickedness and guilt about; and all the spirits of his lot are angels of destruction; they walk in the statutes of darkness."

It is unclear if it is meant to refer to the type of angel that Belial is or a proper name.

== In fiction ==
- In Anne Rice's 1999 novel Vittorio the Vampire, Mastema is an angel that aids the main character in attacking a vampire coven.
- In the Megami Tensei series of video games and its spin-offs, Mastema is portrayed as a demon, although, within the context of the franchise, the term "demon" is used in its classical meaning (cf. daemon) to refer to any supernatural creature. Mastema can be fought but can also join the player's group. In Strange Journey, Mastema represents the Law alignment and plays a significant role within the game.
- In the Digimon game, Digimon Story: Cyber Sleuth, Mastemon is an Angel Digimon who manipulates light and darkness, and has the power to cross through space-time.
- In the Yu-Gi-Oh! trading card game, the card "Darklord Nasten" (堕天使マスティマ, datenshi [= Fallen Angel] Mastema) is based on this demon.
- In the comic book Birthright, Mastema is the name of one of the mages living on Earth that maintain the barrier between worlds. She is revealed shortly after her introduction to be the daughter of the series' main villain.
- In the mobile game Arknights, Mostima is the name of an operator that has angelic and demonic qualities.
- In the Korean MMORPG MapleStory, Mastema (마스테마) is the name of the devout follower of the playable class "Demon", and it can transform into a purple cat to conceal its power.
- In the scare movie "Mastemah" (2022).

== See also ==
- Angra Mainyu
- Azazel
- Iblis
- List of angels in theology
- Lucifer
