= Blood Communion: A Tale of Prince Lestat =

Thirteenth book of The Vampire Chronicles

- First edition cover
- Author: Anne Rice
- Illustrator: Mark Edward Geyer
- Language: English
- Series: The Vampire Chronicles
- Genre: Horror, Gothic
- Published: October 2, 2018
- Publisher: Knopf
- Publication place: United States
- Media type: Print (Hardcover)
- Pages: 272
- ISBN: 978-1-5247-3264-6
- Preceded by: Prince Lestat and the Realms of Atlantis

Blood Communion: A Tale of Prince Lestat is a novel by American writer Anne Rice, the 13th and last book in The Vampire Chronicles series, published on October 2, 2018. It is the first novel of The Vampire Chronicles to contain illustrations (by Mark Edward Geyer). It is the final novel in the series after Rice's passing on December 11, 2021.

== Plot summary ==
The vampire Lestat de Lioncourt recounts his confrontations with the villainous vampire Rhoshamandes; his efforts to successfully rule the vampiric world as Prince Lestat; and his attempts to bring together the vampires of the world into one unified, familial tribe.
