= Prince Lestat and the Realms of Atlantis =

Novel by Anne Rice

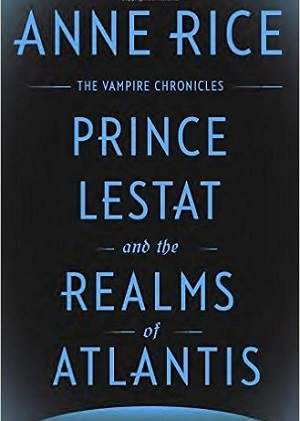
- First edition cover
- Author: Anne Rice
- Language: English
- Series: The Vampire Chronicles
- Genre: Horror, Gothic
- Published: November 29, 2016
- Publisher: Knopf
- Publication place: United States
- Media type: Print (Hardcover)
- Pages: 480
- ISBN: 978-038535379-3
- Preceded by: Prince Lestat
- Followed by: Blood Communion: A Tale of Prince Lestat

Prince Lestat and the Realms of Atlantis is a novel by American writer Anne Rice, the twelfth in The Vampire Chronicles series, published on November 29, 2016. It is written as both a first-person and third-person narrative.

== Plot summary ==
"In my dreams, I saw a city fall into the sea. I heard the cries of thousands", writes Rice, as Lestat de Lioncourt sees visions of a ruined city in his sleep. He and Amel, a spirit Lestat bonded with in the events of the preceding novel, search for the meaning behind the visions of Atlantis, and what it means to the vampires of the world.

The novel presents a lengthy procession of Blood Drinkers from previous adventures as they form a united front against a possible adversary in the form of replimoid beings created many millennia ago for one specific purpose: the destruction of Atlantis and its all-powerful ruler – Amel.
