= Josh Boone (director) =

American filmmaker

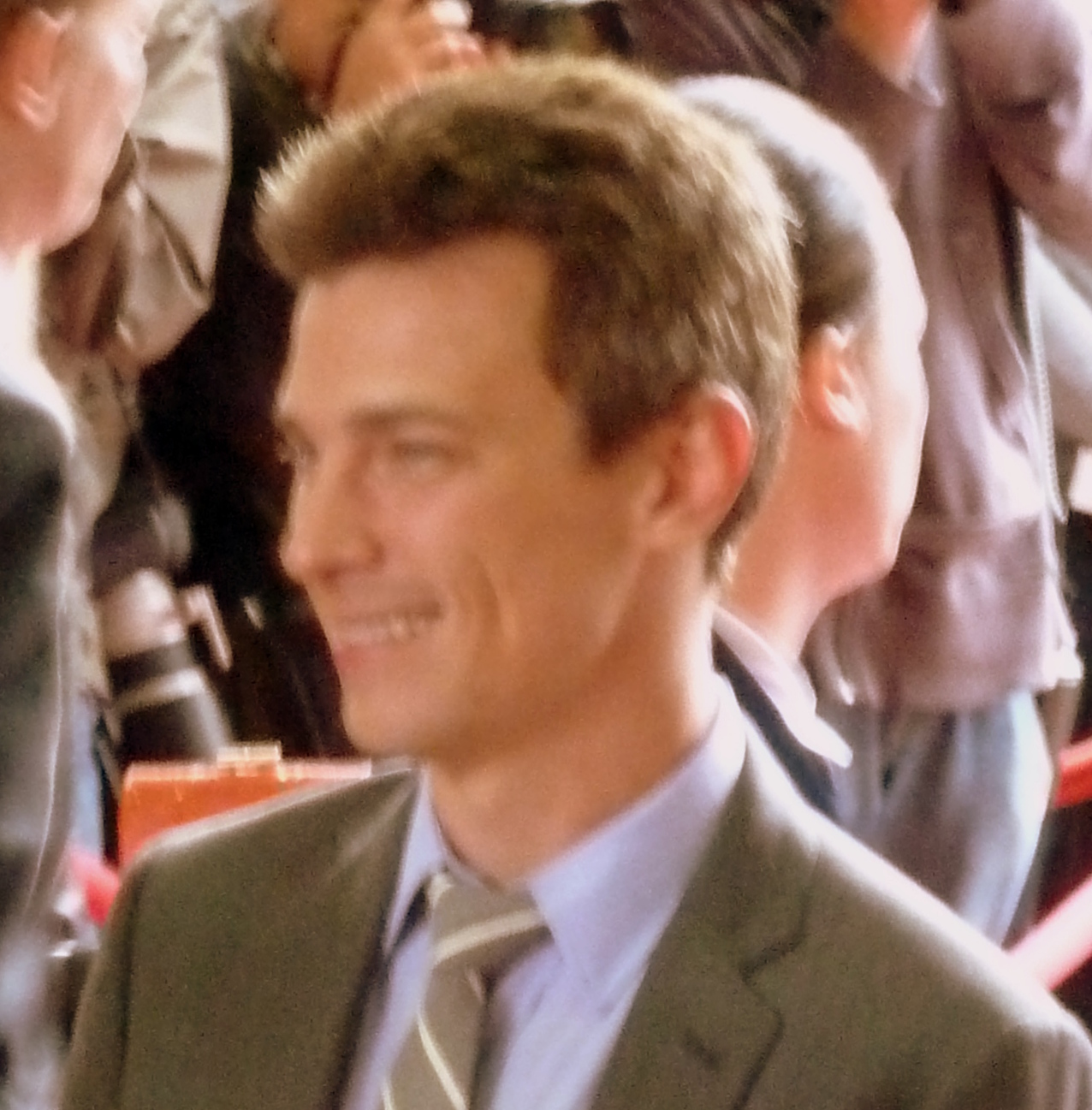
- Boone in September 2012
- Born: April 5, 1979 (age 47); Virginia Beach, Virginia, U.S.
- Occupations: Director; producer; screenwriter
- Years active: 2012–present
- Children: 2

Josh Boone (born April 5, 1979) is an American filmmaker. He is best known for directing the romantic drama The Fault in Our Stars (2014). Boone also wrote and directed the romantic comedy Stuck in Love (2012) and the superhero horror film The New Mutants (2020). In 2020, he directed the first and last episode of the miniseries The Stand.

== Career ==
Boone made his film debut as writer and director of the romantic comedy-drama film Stuck in Love, which premiered in September 2012 at the Toronto International Film Festival. It began a limited theatrical release in the United States in July 2013. The film earned mixed to positive reviews from critics.

In February 2013, Boone was hired to direct the romantic comedy-drama film The Fault in Our Stars, based on John Green's 2012 novel of the same name. It released the following year, receiving positive reviews from critics and numerous awards. In September 2013, Boone announced that he was working on an adaptation of Stephen King's novel Lisey's Story, but he later dropped out.

On February 25, 2014, it was reported that Boone was hired to write and direct an adaptation of Stephen King's horror/fantasy novel The Stand, working together with Warner Bros. In November of the same year, Boone revealed that he plans to split his adaptation into four full-length feature films in an effort to remain true to the breadth of King's sprawling novel. Boone was also in early talks with Universal Studios in August 2014 to write and direct an adaptation of The Vampire Lestat, the second novel in author Anne Rice's Vampire Chronicles. The film adaptation was to combine elements of both the second and third books in the series. However, the project was cancelled as Universal did not renew their option on Rice's work.

On May 13, 2015, it was reported he closed a deal with 20th Century Fox to co-write and direct The New Mutants, a standalone spin-off that expands the X-Men film series. Boone also wrote the script for Pretenders, which is a film directed by James Franco, who became acquainted with Boone after Franco was attached to star in his adaptation of The Stand. Boone originally intended to direct the film in 2014 with Anton Yelchin, Imogen Poots, Michael B. Jordan, and Dianna Agron attached to star.

In 2025, Boone directed the film Regretting You starring Allison Williams and Mckenna Grace. The film is an adaptation of the book of the same name, written by Colleen Hoover.

== Filmography ==
| Year | Title | Director | Writer | Producer |
|---|---|---|---|---|
| 2012 | Stuck in Love | Yes | Yes | No |
| 2014 | The Fault in Our Stars | Yes | No | No |
| 2016 | All We Had | No | Yes | Executive |
| 2018 | Pretenders | No | Yes | No |
| 2020 | The New Mutants | Yes | Yes | No |
| 2022 | Press Play | No | Story | Yes |
| 2025 | Regretting You | Yes | No | No |
| 2027 | Fake Skating | Yes | No | No |

Executive producer only

- Cardboard Boxer (2016)
- Horseshoe Theory (2017) (Short film)
- My Pretty Pony (2017)
- The Cat and the Moon (2019)

Television

| Year | Title | Director | Writer | Executive Producer | Notes |
|---|---|---|---|---|---|
| 2020–2021 | The Stand | Yes | Yes | Yes | Miniseries |

Special Thanks

- Bethany (2017)
