= Lestat de Lioncourt =

Fictional character created by Anne Rice

- The Vampire Chronicles character
- Tom Cruise as Lestat (1994)
- First appearance: Interview with the Vampire (1976)
- Last appearance: Blood Communion: A Tale of Prince Lestat (2018)
- Created by: Anne Rice
- Portrayed by: Tom Cruise (1994 film); Stuart Townsend (2002 film); Hugh Panaro (2006 musical); Sam Reid (2022 TV series)

In-universe information
- Alias: The Vampire Lestat
- Nicknames: The Brat Prince; Wolfkiller; The Damndest Creature; The Rule-breaker
- Species: Vampire
- Gender: Male
- Title: Prince
- Occupation: Hunter; Theater actor Rock star Author
- Family: Gabrielle de Lioncourt (mother/fledgling); The Marquis (father); Augustin (eldest brother); Five unnamed elder siblings
- Spouse: Louis de Pointe du Lac
- Children: Claudia (fledgling/adoptive daughter); Viktor (biological son); Rose (adoptive daughter)
- Religion: Catholic (as a human, by family duty)
- Nationality: French; American (naturalized)

Lestat de Lioncourt (French: [lɛstat də ljɔ̃kuʁ]) is a fictional character from Anne Rice's The Vampire Chronicles novel series. Born in the mid 1700s, Lestat is an immortal vampire and the antihero of the series.

== Publication history ==
Lestat is introduced in Rice's 1976 novel Interview with the Vampire, the first book of what would become The Vampire Chronicles. His full backstory is explored in The Vampire Lestat (1985), which follows Lestat's exploits from his youth in the Auvergne region of France to his early years as a vampire fledgling. Lestat is the lead character in most novels in the main series, including The Queen of the Damned (1988), The Tale of the Body Thief (1992), Memnoch the Devil (1995), and Blood Canticle (2003). Rice later revisited the Lestat-centric series, starting with Prince Lestat (2014), followed by Prince Lestat and the Realms of Atlantis (2016) and Blood Communion: A Tale of Prince Lestat (2018).

=== Character development ===
According to Rice, Lestat was largely inspired by her husband, the poet and artist Stan Rice; both have blond hair and they share November 7 as a birth date. In a 2003 interview, Rice noted that the character had also taken on some of her own attributes, stating, "Stan was Lestat; he was the inspiration. Perhaps it is best to say Lestat was Stan and me. He was Stan and what Stan taught me. Lestat was inspired by Stan, and then I became Lestat." Rice believed "Lestat" to be an old Louisianan name, and later found that she had misspelled "Lestan". According to the characters themselves, who discuss the issue in Blackwood Farm, Blood Canticle and Memnoch the Devil, the name is pronounced "les-dot" "with a rather French flair."

== Fictional character biography ==
=== Physical appearance ===
Lestat describes himself as six feet tall. He has blond hair that is not quite shoulder length, and that is rather curly, which sometimes appears white under fluorescent lighting. His eyes are gray-blue, but they reflect the colors of blue or violet easily from surfaces around them. He has a short narrow nose, and a mouth that is well shaped, but has always been slightly large for his face. His mouth can look very mean or extremely generous, but always sensual. He has a continuously animated face. Lestat's fingernails (like those of all vampires in The Vampire Chronicles) look like they are made of glass.

=== Personality ===
Because of his boldness, enthusiasm, and defiance, Lestat's seniors refer to him affectionately as "The Brat Prince", a title of which he is very fond. He is very vain and concerned with fashion, and will pause mid-narrative to remind the reader what he is wearing. He enjoys performing on stage, which he does as both a mortal actor in Paris and a vampire in his rock band called The Vampire Lestat, that he forms with a group of humans in the 1980s. Lestat is also fond of music; he sings and plays the piano and violin. Although he is illiterate as a mortal man, he learns to read and loves literature as a vampire. In one period of his life, he becomes a hermit and spends every night holed up at home, reading.

The first language that Lestat learns is French, although he "writes" his novels in English. In The Vampire Lestat, he notes that despite his French accent, he speaks English "like a cross between a boatman and Sam Spade" and is fond of slang.

Lestat in the books is bisexual, and has male and female lovers as both a vampire and a mortal. He is attracted to whoever most interests him at the time. Most of his early experiences are with male companions; he himself explains this by saying the women in previous centuries simply were not as interesting as men. Later in the series, Lestat offhandedly mentions that he is frightened of women and finds them extremely and egregiously distracting.

Throughout his long life, Lestat is plagued by common philosophical questions, such as "Are my actions good or bad?", "Is there a God?", "Am I in His plan?", "What happens after death?", and "What makes a person happy?" He finds himself more in love with humanity than ever before, despite his relationship with mankind being savage. For a while, he sees life as "the Savage Garden", filled with beauty and death.

Lestat exhibits a strong altruistic nature at several points in the series. For instance, after he first becomes a vampire, he sends large gifts to his family and friends, purchases the theatre where he once worked, and settles the debts of his old manager, Renaud. Later, after his brothers and family are killed in the French Revolution, he steps forward to care for his ailing father, the only survivor, despite their hateful relationship. Lestat also frequently hunts evildoers instead of feeding from innocent victims, although he does not always abide by this rule.

As a vampire, Lestat's abilities include telepathy, mind reading, superhuman physical attributes, and rapid healing. After receiving blood from several ancient vampires, including Magnus, Marius de Romanus, and Akasha, Lestat's strength increases dramatically and allows him to fly, perform feats of telekinesis and pyrokinesis, and survive exposure to the sun. After Lestat ate the brain of Mekare, he was infused with the spirit of Amel and became the Host of the Sacred Core.

Although he is painted as an anti-hero in Interview with the Vampire, he is quick to defend his own behavior. In The Vampire Lestat, he spends much of the book telling people he is hardly the monster previous narrators have made him out to be. In much of the book, (and its follow up, The Queen of the Damned), he is instead painted as a fun-loving anti-hero who is complicit in the destruction of Akasha, the vampire queen. He loved her completely yet did not agree with her fundamental viewpoint on "morality", leading to her demise.

=== History ===
Lestat was born on November 7, 1760, as the seventh son of the marquis d'Auvergne in the Auvergne region of France. Only two of his brothers survive to adulthood. While they are technically aristocrats, the de Lioncourt family's fortune has been squandered, and they live in relative poverty in their medieval castle. Lestat's mother, Gabrielle, is the only literate member of the family. Lestat's father is blind and spends his days playing chess.

Lestat's relationships with his father and brothers are bad - he tells his mother "I dream sometimes that I might kill them all. I kill my father and my brothers in the dream. I go from room to room slaughtering them as I did the wolves." He attempts to escape from them several times, first by asking to remain at a monastery, and later by running away with a troupe of traveling players. In both instances, he is returned to his family. Encouraged by his mother, who sells her family heirloom jewels to purchase horses, guns, and mastiff dogs for him, Lestat takes up hunting, and soon becomes the family breadwinner.

The townspeople of Lestat's village request his help with a pack of wolves that are terrorizing the town. He rides into the mountains and kills the entire pack of eight, losing his horse, dogs, and nearly his own life in the process. Although his bravery wins him the respect and admiration of the villagers, who present him with a lush red velvet cloak and boots made from the pelts of the wolves, he goes into a deep depression.

Prodded by Gabrielle, he eventually leaves Auvergne with friend and lover Nicolas and heads for Paris, intending to become an actor. During performances, he attracts the attention of an ancient vampire named Magnus, who later abducts him and transforms him into a vampire against his will.

Immediately after turning Lestat, Magnus commits suicide, leaving Lestat to fend for himself without any kind of guidance. Lestat finds himself heir to a nearly inexhaustible fortune, and begins an adventure that leads him all around the world.

=== Relationships with other characters ===
Despite his charisma, Lestat is portrayed as a lonesome individual. In his childhood, the only member of his family with whom he had any connection was his mother, Gabrielle. She is the only member of the family who could read, and she often immersed herself in novels, neglecting the mundane life around her. Lestat both admires and hates her for this, yet he is the only person of her family she can confide in; they develop a silent but strong bond. For this very reason Lestat makes a dying Gabrielle his first vampire companion when she comes to Paris in search of her son, wishing to see him before she succumbs to consumption.

Lestat also makes his friend and lover, Nicolas de Lenfent, a vampire. As humans, they find work at a small theatre called "Renaud's". Lestat starts off as a stage hand and then, to his surprise, becomes star of the show when he steps in for another actor. Nicolas is a violinist and performs with the theatre's small orchestra. After Lestat is abducted and made a vampire, he tries to distance himself from his mortal friends and family, but he still provides for them. He buys Nicolas an apartment and many other luxuries, such as a Stradivarius violin, with his newly acquired "coin of the realm". Nicolas is suspicious, and insists that Lestat was in fact abducted from their room at night, calling out to Nicolas. Lestat gives in to the love he feels for Nicolas and makes him a vampire as well after saving him from the self-proclaimed Children of Darkness, a coven of vampires led by Armand. But Nicolas rejects Lestat and sinks into madness. Lestat collapses Armand's coven, buys Renaud's old theatre, and gives it to Nicolas and Eleni, one of Armand's former acolytes. Nicolas founds the Théàtre des Vampires, while Lestat and Gabrielle leave Paris to explore the world. Unhappy with life as a vampire, Nicolas immolates himself in a bonfire, leaving Lestat scarred with his insanity and death.

Another fledgling and long-term companion is Louis de Pointe du Lac, who is from a family who emigrated from France to North America when he was very young. He is described as a beautiful, angelic young man with "fine black hair" and deep green eyes, whom Lestat turns into a vampire in 1791. For many years, Lestat and Louis live, travel, and kill together. Though Louis claims that Lestat made him into a vampire because Lestat merely wanted his fortune, Lestat refutes these claims in the following novel. He points out that he was heir to a vast fortune well before meeting him, and says that he "fell fatally in love with Louis", who reminded him of Nicki.

Lestat and Louis "adopt" a dying orphan named Claudia in 1795. Lestat turns her into a vampire in order to tie Louis to him. While Lestat spoils Claudia and tries to teach her how to behave like a vampire, she largely ignores him and reserves her love for Louis. In 1860, after 65 years of living together, Claudia rebels and tries to kill Lestat by giving him two dead boys poisoned with absinthe and laudanum, then cutting his throat and stabbing him in the chest. With Louis's help, she dumps him in a swamp near the Mississippi River. After Lestat comes back and assaults them with the help of a young composer he has transformed into a vampire, Louis flees with Claudia. In desperation, they burn down their French Quarter house while Lestat is still inside.

Louis and Claudia flee to Europe. Lestat follows them, and encounters them at the Théâtre des Vampires. Claudia dies from sun exposure while Louis is held captive by Armand and his followers. Armand leaves with Louis, finally feeling that he has had his revenge on Lestat for ruining his coven.

At the turn of the 20th century, Louis once again discovers Lestat living in New Orleans in a weakened state. Louis turns his back on him in pity and disgust. This version of events, however, is also refuted by Lestat, who made no mention of contact with Louis in that era, though he had been visited by Armand and freely admits that his memory of this period is fragmented. Louis and Lestat reunite in the 1980s with a new understanding, only to be caught up and briefly separated again in the events that are detailed in The Queen of the Damned, though in later books Lestat refers to Louis as his lover.

Lestat has a disdain for rules and order, and states, in The Queen of the Damned, that he has always had to be his own teacher. He openly disregards and refuses to show fear to Armand, the leader of the Paris coven, even when confronted with the possibility of execution. The only immortal Lestat appears to openly respect and defer to is Marius. Lestat seeks him out as a mentor in the late 18th century, leaving him messages across Europe and Asia until Marius decides to reveal himself. While Lestat eagerly learns from Marius, he also openly breaches many of the rules Marius seeks to impress upon him, such as the prohibition on revealing himself to mortals. Such behavior inspires Marius to refer to Lestat as "the damnedest creature" and nickname him "the Brat Prince." Lestat sought Marius out to be his teacher but the relationship turned out also to be a father-son relationship.

Lestat is entirely responsible for the epic triumph and tragedy told in The Queen of the Damned, after he presents himself to the world through his autobiography and formation of a rock band, singing vampire secrets. His songs waken Akasha, the Queen of the Damned, from her sleep, and she takes Lestat on as her lover while she enacts a horrible plan to take over the world. This adventure forces Lestat to think of things and people other than himself for one of the first times in his long life, and the adventure changes him forever, forcing him to begin fighting for a kind of redemption—though, as displayed in The Tale of the Body Thief, Lestat remains his old, devilish self, revelling in his identity as the Brat Prince.

After the mysterious and mystical events of Memnoch the Devil, Lestat falls into a vampiric sleep from which the Mayfair witch Merrick eventually manages to wake him, forging a bond between them. After the spiritual, emotional and mystical changes within Lestat during his adventures in the heavenly and hellish realms he visited, Lestat became a legend amongst the remaining vampires, taking control of New Orleans and killing any fledgling vampires who killed mortals in his city. While it is largely due to his actions that the Talamasca—an order of scholars who study the supernatural world but vow to never interfere in it—declare a kind of war on vampires, it is also due to his efforts that no lives are taken over the course of the dispute between the two groups.

Lestat is sought out by a desperate Tarquin Blackwood in the novel Blackwood Farm to help him with a problem the young vampire feels only the legendary Lestat can help him with. Though Lestat suffers losses from this adventure, he falls somewhat in love with Quinn, and the two stay close after their adventure together reaches its conclusion.

In Blood Canticle, Lestat falls in love with a witch of the Mayfair clan named Rowan Mayfair, who shares the same feelings towards him. Rowan eventually asks Lestat to turn her into a vampire but, despite their feelings toward one another, he painfully chose not to, because she is a guiding figure in the Mayfair family and he cannot take her away from it or from her faithful and loving husband Michael.

In Prince Lestat and the Realms of Atlantis, Lestat (now the leader of the vampire tribe) reunites with Louis, who left Armand and his home at Trinity Gate. Lestat requests Louis return with him to the chateau in France as his companion and confidante; Louis agrees and becomes consort to Lestat, taking an active role in solving the dilemma the tribe face in that novel.

== Appearances in other media ==
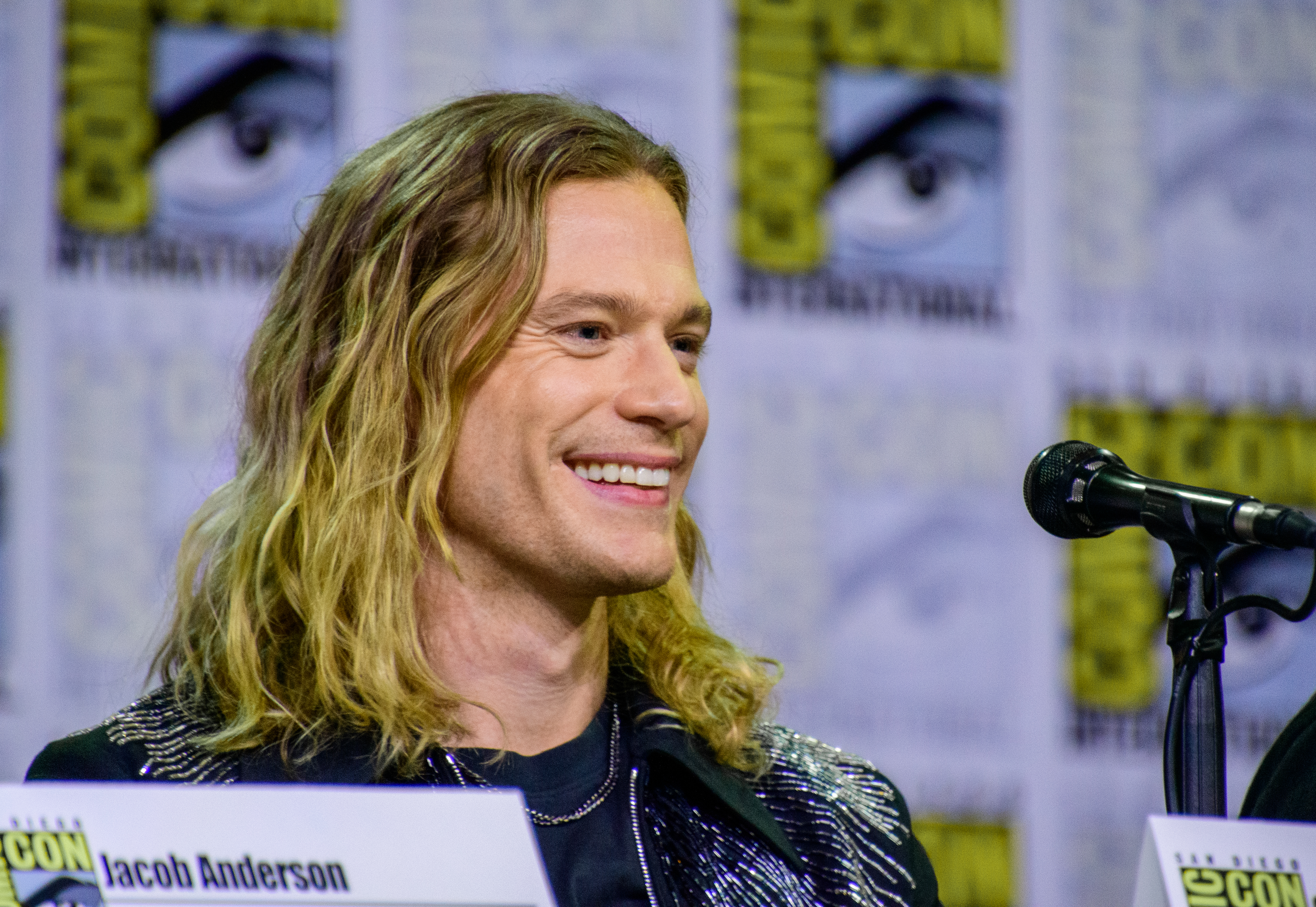
Sam Reid portrays Lestat in the 2022 TV series Interview with the Vampire.

=== Films ===
Lestat appears as a major character in both motion picture adaptations of The Vampire Chronicles novels.

- In Neil Jordan's 1994 film adaptation of Interview with the Vampire, he is portrayed by Tom Cruise.
- In the 2002 film adaptation of Queen of the Damned, he is portrayed by Stuart Townsend.

=== Theatre ===
On stage, Lestat was portrayed by Hugh Panaro in the short-lived Broadway show Lestat: The Musical composed by Elton John and Bernie Taupin, with Drew Sarich, who was playing Armand, as the understudy.

=== Television ===
In the 2022 television series adaptation of Interview with the Vampire on AMC, he is portrayed by Sam Reid.

== In popular culture ==
Lestat became the name and focus of a gothic rock band in Cleveland, Ohio, signed by Jevan Records who split up in 1999.
