= The Vampire Lestat =

1985 vampire novel by Anne Rice

- First edition
- Author: Anne Rice
- Language: English
- Series: The Vampire Chronicles
- Genre: Gothic, Horror
- Published: October 31, 1985
- Publisher: Knopf
- Publication place: United States
- Media type: Print
- Pages: 560
- ISBN: 978-0394534435
- Preceded by: Interview with the Vampire
- Followed by: The Queen of the Damned

The Vampire Lestat (1985) is a vampire novel by American writer Anne Rice, the second in her Vampire Chronicles, following Interview with the Vampire (1976). The story is told from the point of view of the vampire Lestat de Lioncourt, while Interview is narrated by Louis de Pointe du Lac.

The novel follows Lestat's rise to fame as a 1980s rockstar, his early experiences as a vampire, and his search for meaning and connection in his vampiric existence. It also offers some of Lestat's perspective on the events of Interview with the Vampire, which has been published as an in-universe novel by the journalist, Daniel Molloy.

== Plot summary ==
Following the events of the first book, in the 1980s, the vampire Lestat is awakened. As a response to Louis's recollections, Lestat decides to publish his own autobiography and join a rock band, "The Vampire Lestat". He hopes the notoriety will reunite him with those from his past, as well as expose vampires to the world.

Lestat's autobiography opens in the 18th century with his life in an impoverished family, where he has few prospects except the arts. By age 20, Lestat is sent to kill invasive wolves and barely survives, becoming depressed. His mother, Gabrielle, encourages him to meet Nicolas de Lenfent, who has recently returned from Paris. After connecting, the pair run away to Paris and get jobs at a theater.

One of Lestat's admirers is a centuries-old vampire, Magnus, who sees Lestat as a potential heir to his power. He kidnaps, imprisons, and later forces Lestat to become a vampire before killing himself. Horrified and exhilarated, Lestat stays away from his family while taking victims he deems malicious. He watches Nicolas and his theatre troupe from afar but later seeks them out and becomes overwhelmed by their scents. Delirious, Lestat chaotically reveals his powers onstage. After this, he feels irreconcilably inhuman and begins taking innocent victims. Gabrielle, dying of tuberculosis, finds Lestat. To save her, Lestat transforms her into a vampire. The pair runs afoul of the Children of Darkness, a coven of devil-worshipping vampires led by Armand, who disapproves of them mingling with humanity; Armand kidnaps Nicolas to lure Lestat. Gabrielle and Lestat later escape with Nicolas, who begs to become a vampire; Lestat reluctantly transforms him.

At a ball, Armand attempts to seduce and drain Lestat, but Lestat is resilient. Armand asks for companionship, and reveals he was made by a Roman vampire, Marius de Romanus. Lestat refuses him but offers Armand the theater, as the coven's cemetery is set to be demolished. Armand and Nicolas, alongside some of the coven vampires, found the Theatre des Vampires to perform disturbing plays. Lestat despises the corruption of the theatre, and Nicolas scorns Lestat's attempts at humanity, joining Armand while Lestat travels with Gabrielle.

Lestat leaves messages for Marius in numerous places and leaves France with Gabrielle. He learns that Nicolas became mad and killed himself, while Lestat's brothers later died in the French Revolution. Gabrielle tells Lestat she intends to go away from humanity, and they part. Overwhelmed, Lestat descends into the earth to sleep.

Lestat is awoken by Marius, who takes him to his home. He shows Lestat the progenitors of all vampires, Akasha and Enkil. He tells of when they were exposed to sunlight, killing all but the oldest vampires. Marius was transformed to discover what caused the calamity and now safeguards the pair. Marius warns Lestat not to disturb Akasha and Enkil, but Lestat feels compelled to see them. After awakening the pair, Lestat is attacked by Enkil. He is saved by Marius, who says Lestat cannot stay. Marius advises him to live one "human" lifetime; without one, he will not have the strength to endure immortality.

Lestat recalls Interview with the Vampire, including his arrival in New Orleans, his love for Louis, and remorse for turning Claudia into a child vampire, feeling she was justified in her attempt to kill him. Lestat reveals that after Claudia's attempt, he went to Armand to beg for blood to heal. Armand refused and manipulated Lestat into testifying against Claudia, whom Armand believed should not exist. After the trial in which Claudia is destroyed, Armand claims he also destroyed Louis. Armand tells Lestat he has not forgiven his prior rejection and destruction of his coven before pushing him off a tower. After recovering, Lestat returns to New Orleans. He wastes away for several years before going to sleep in the earth.

In the present, before Lestat's concert, Louis tracks him down. Louis has read Lestat's autobiography, just as Lestat read Louis's Interview with the Vampire, and they reconcile. Lestat proceeds with the concert and they kiss. The concert is later attacked by vampires who oppose Lestat's revelations, until they burst into flames. Gabrielle arrives after tracking Lestat's recent stardom and they escape with Louis. It is revealed that Lestat's concert has awakened Akasha, who burned the attacking vampires. Lestat feels Akasha arrive to kidnap him for some unknown purpose.

== Background ==
Anne Rice's inspiration for Lestat's rock star persona was the Doors' lead vocalist Jim Morrison. whose music she discovered when she was writing The Vampire Lestat. Rice related in a May 2010 Facebook post, "It was Morrison's voice I heard when I wrote the songs for Lestat. He's the closest thing in the wide world to my hero."

== Publication ==
The Vampire Lestat was released on October 31, 1985. Told from the point of view of Lestat, who was previously introduced in Interview with the Vampire, the novel explores the titular vampire's backstory. The Vampire Lestat also reinforces and expands upon Rice's vampire mythology, and The New York Times critic Michiko Kakutani noted, "We learn lots of 'facts' about vampires and vampire culture. We learn that they cry tears of blood, that they're capable of reading other people's minds, that they can be destroyed by fire and sunlight. We learn that 'no vampire may ever destroy another vampire, except that the coven master has the power of life and death over all of his flock'; and we learn that 'no vampire shall ever reveal his true nature to a mortal and allow that mortal to live'."

In December 1985, it was reported that the novel would soon be adapted into a film.

== Adaptations ==
=== Anne Rice's The Vampire Lestat ===
The Vampire Lestat was adapted into a comic and released as a 12-part miniseries by Innovation Comics in 1990 and 1991. The comic, which was formally titled Anne Rice's The Vampire Lestat and featured Daerick Gross and Mike Okamoto as lead artists, had a script adapted from the novel by Rice and Faye Perozich. In 1991 the entire series was published as a graphic novel by Ballantine.

=== Queen of the Damned ===
Parts of The Vampire Lestat and The Queen of the Damned were loosely adapted into the 2002 film Queen of the Damned. The film was a critical failure, and disappointed some viewers. Rice herself dismissed the film. On her Facebook page, any time the subject was brought up, she repeatedly commented that The Queen of the Damned film is not something she could understand or embrace, that she encouraged them not to do the film and that it hurt her to see her work "mutilated" the way it was.

=== Lestat: The Musical ===
The novel formed the basis for the short-lived 2006 Broadway show Lestat. The musical, which was composed by Elton John and Bernie Taupin and written by Linda Woolverton, had a pre-Broadway tryout in California in late 2005 and ran for a total of 33 previews and 39 official performances at the Palace Theater in New York.

=== Television ===
In November 2016, Rice announced on Facebook that the rights to her novels were reverted to her despite earlier plans for other adaptations. Rice said that she and her son Christopher would be developing and executive producing a potential television series based on the novels. In April 2017, they teamed up with Paramount Television and Anonymous Content to develop a series. As of early 2018, Bryan Fuller was involved with the creation of a potential TV series based on the novels. On July 17, 2018, it was announced that the series was in development at streaming service Hulu and that Fuller had departed the production. As of December 2019, Hulu's rights had expired and Rice was shopping a package including all film and TV rights to the series. In May 2020, it was announced that AMC had acquired the rights to The Vampire Chronicles and Lives of the Mayfair Witches for developing film and television projects with Anne and Christopher Rice serving as executive producers on any projects developed.

Interview with the Vampire premiered on October 2, 2022, and Mayfair Witches on January 8, 2023. The second season of Interview with the Vampire features flashbacks to some of the events of The Vampire Lestat, including Lestat's life as an actor in the 18th century, his relationship with Nicolas, and his meeting and conflict with Armand. The show was renewed in June 2024 with the third season slated to adapt The Vampire Lestat. A teaser for the season was released in July 2024 following Comic Con, which showed Sam Reid as Lestat in his rockstar persona reciting the first few lines of the novel. The third season premiered on June 7, 2026 with seven episodes. It follows Lestat as a rockstar in 2025 as he travels the country playing shows, trying to spread his songs like vampiric gospel. The season also provides flashbacks to Lestat's human life and his time as a vampire before arriving in New Orleans and meeting Louis de Pointe du Lac.

=== Audiobooks ===
There have been three audiobook adaptations of The Vampire Lestat: a 1989 abridged version narrated by Michael York; a 1994 unabridged version narrated by Frank Muller; and a 2011 unabridged version narrated by Simon Vance.

== Critical reception ==
The Vampire Lestat debuted at No. 9 on The New York Times Best Seller list, spending a total of six weeks on the list. The New York Times critic Michiko Kakutani found Rice's vampire mythology "more compelling than the rest of the novel", and wrote, "While Lestat's not an unlikable vampire ... it's hard to take his dilemmas all that seriously." Kirkus Reviews wrote that "Rice dots Lestat's tale with some marvelous chillers ... vampire bonanza in appropriate dark, humid, spider-web narrative—Rice's specialty" The Free Lance–Star wrote: "“The Vampire Lestat” is tedious at times, especially when the vampires are arguing among themselves over their fundamental philosophy." Ottawa Citizen called the novel "a masterpiece of the genre". Reviewing the audiobook adaptation, AudioFile wrote that "the plot twists are difficult to follow at times".

Dave Langford reviewed The Vampire Lestat for White Dwarf #86, and stated that "[Rice is] audacious enough to propound an acceptable 'origin story' for vampirism, and to move from dark old Egyptian mysteries to the extremes of twentieth-century Dionysian ecstasy as Lestat gives his first live rock performance. Nice one."
