= Hawthorne season 1 =

Hawthorne
- Season 1
- DVD cover
- No. of episodes: 10

Release
- Original network: TNT
- Original release: June 16 – August 18, 2009

Season chronology
- Next → Season 2

The first season of Hawthorne, premiered on TNT on June 16, 2009. The season contains 10 episodes and concluded airing on August 18, 2009.

== Season synopsis ==
Season one shows Christina dealing with financial issues at Richmond Trinity Hospital (where she is Chief Nursing Officer), dealing with her rebellious daughter and coming to terms with her recently deceased husband, Michael. We are introduced to her closest friends and to Tom Wakefield, a doctor who once took care of her ailing husband and harbors feelings for her.

== Cast ==
=== Main cast ===
- Jada Pinkett Smith as Christina Hawthorne, Chief Nursing Officer of Richmond Trinity
- Michael Vartan as Dr. Tom Wakefield, M.D., Chief of Surgery of Richmond Trinity
- David Julian Hirsh as Nurse Ray Stein
- Suleka Mathew as Nurse Bobbie Jackson, Richmond Trinity ER RN Charge Nurse
- Christina Moore as Nurse Candy Sullivan
- Hannah Hodson as Camille Hawthorne

=== Recurring cast ===
- Vanessa Lengies as Nurse Kelly Epson
- Aisha Hinds as Isabel Walsh
- Jillian Armenante as Richmond Trinity Charge Nurse Cheryl Brooks
- Joanna Cassidy as Amanda Hawthorne, Richmond Trinity Board Member
- James Morrison as John Morrissey, CEO of Richmond Trinity
- D.B. Woodside as David Gendler
- Rebecca Field as Susan Winters, Richmond Trinity Social Worker
- Anne Ramsay as Dr. Brenda Marshall

== Production ==
John Masius created the program and served as executive producer for the first season. Glen Mazzara also served as executive producer for the first season. The program was initially going to be called Time Heals. Megan Branman and Dylann Brander of Branman/Brander Casting were involved in casting for the program. In September 2008, Jamie Tarses was reported to be an executive producer on the program.

In September 2008, The Press of Atlantic City reported that Jada Pinkett Smith signed on as both the star of the television pilot, and to serve as executive producer of the program. Pinkett Smith had previously promised never to work in television again, but changed her mind after reading the script of the pilot. She recalled getting the script from her manager: "He said, 'I would never send this to you if I didn't think it was fantastic.' I read it and then I let my husband read it. (Will) said to take the meeting and see." She decided to return to television because of the show's unique qualities.

In the pilot, Jeffrey Nordling portrayed Dr. Tom Wakefield, director of medicine. In February 2009, Michael Vartan was cast to co-star alongside Pinkett Smith as Dr. Tom Wakefield in the series. By June 6, 2009, the program's title had been changed to Hawthorne.

== Episodes ==
No. overall	No. in season	Title	Directed by	Written by	Original release date	U.S. viewers (millions)
1	1	"Pilot"	Mikael Salomon	John Masius	June 16, 2009	3.82
Christina must try and stop David, who is dying of cancer from ending his life. Christina also must try to find time to deal with her husband's death.
2	2	"Healing Time"	Arvin Brown	John Masius	June 23, 2009	3.76
Christina has a big problem on her hands after a brain aneurysm patient believes Christina is his wife and wants only her opinion.
3	3	"Yielding"	Jeff Bleckner	Sarah Thorp	June 30, 2009	N/A
Christina tries to make things easier for a son who isn't ready to say good bye to his dying mother by having an ICU bed ready for her.
4	4	"All the Wrong Places"	Andy Wolk	Glen Mazzara	July 7, 2009	2.63
A mother and son are admitted into the ER after a car crash. It is decided the boy needs to go into foster care until his mother is better, but Christina, backed up by Bobbie, say he is not medically ready. This turns out to be true as the boy starts to have the same symptoms as his mother. With each patient getting a different doctor, it is up to Christina to prove that the symptoms have the same cause, before the boy receives the wrong medicine and the mother goes into surgery. However, the main question is, will Tom believe Christina if she tells him the true problem?
5	5	"The Sense of Belonging"	Mike Robe	Anna C. Miller	July 14, 2009	3.20
Amanda, Christina's mother-in-law, is in the hospital with the possibility of having cancer. Ray is assigned her private nurse and Christina is not told what is happening. Ray dislikes the fact that Candy is going out for drinks with Larry, because Larry tricked her. The already poor condition of a patient becomes Christina's center of focus, but she still has enough time to know what is happening in her own hospital.
6	6	"Trust Me"	Ed Bianchi	Jeff Rake	July 21, 2009	3.21
Camille is supposed to be at the library studying, but instead is at the park with a boy, Ryan. She then has to drive him to the hospital when he has unbearable heartburn. The boy later flat lines and has to be revived. His father, an ENT, shows up with the mother, who say there is no chance he could be on drugs (as was suggested) and then blame Camille when the test is positive. The father then demands that they move his son to the hospital he works at and implies it is better. That is until Camille talks to Ryan and learns where the drugs are from. All the while, Sacred Heart has to close their ER and John volunteers Richmond Trinity to pick up the slack. This leads to more patients and not enough space. Ray is followed around by a reporter doing an exposé on the overload, but later discovers that the reporter is not who he appears to be.
7	7	"Night Moves"	Roxann Dawson	Bill Chais	July 28, 2009	3.61
While a teenage girl is in labor, two sets of parents show up with legitimate documents to adopt the baby boy and Christina must find a solution. The child's father, also a teenager, shows up and is desiring custody of the baby, even willing to pay the mother for it. Bobbie allows Isabel to sleep at her house with devastating consequences. Ray fills in as a medic for Tom at a hockey game. After a huge fight breaks out many of the people, players and fans alike, end up in the ER. Meanwhile, Tom is on a date when he is called to take care of one of his patients. He chooses work over his companion and she leaves. Christina, feeling bad for Tom, sets up a surprise.
8	8	"No Guts, No Glory"	Andy Wolk	Laurie Arent	August 4, 2009	3.58
The episode opens with Christina trying to teach Camille how to drive. Since Camille thinks she is being too hard, Christina enlists Kelly's help, who, it turns out, has a serious problem with road rage. Bobbie has to take care of a racist man and uses the opportunity to teach his son that just because his father thinks one way, doesn't mean he is required to do the same. Ray is taking care of a motorcyclist who was going to propose to his girlfriend before he became paralyzed. However, there is an option to end the paralysis, but it could result in the man's death. Candy is taking care of the female motorcyclist and has a fight with Ray about the case. All the while, Christina is taking care of a woman who looks like her boyfriend is abusing her. It is later revealed that her son is autistic and Christina tries to find a solution that works for both of them.
9	9	"Mother's Day"	Jeff Bleckner	Glen Mazzara	August 11, 2009	3.35
It is budget cut season. Tom is told to fire a doctor that has been working there for over 30 years. Christina is told to lay off 6 nurses and as she is working out a solution to save money without firing anyone, Kelly is called out by Dr. Marshall after saving her patient by going against the doctor's wishes. When a great tragedy strikes in the ER, Kelly is left to wonder if she should quit. Bobbie, who Christina left in charge while she was butting heads with the budget lawyer, is forced to uplift the nurses spirits, even though she does not want to. Christina shockingly has something close to a mental breakdown.
10	10	"Hello and Goodbye"	Jeff Bleckner	Sarah Thorp & Anna C. Miller	August 18, 2009	3.52
Kelly has problems saying goodbye to Mr. Flemming. Isabel fakes an injury to get into the ER to see Bobbie, to apologize for stealing her leg. She come back later, injured for real with the leg in her hands. Christina tries to get David into an experimental test when his cancer comes back. But to do this she is required to take him off his current case and effectively abandon his patient. Candy has something important to say to Ray, who is afraid that Dr. Marshall has told Candy about their meeting. The truth is much more shocking than his imagination. Candy is a Captain in the US Army Nurse's Corp, and was set to deploy to Afghanistan on a 6-month tour of duty as a combat nurse. Camille is shadowing Amanda for the day, but that goes downhill when John talks badly about Christina and Amanda agrees. Later, Amanda goes and sees Christina and they take Camille to the ocean to say goodbye to Michael's ashes. As Christina's walking away from the pier the season ends with one last surprise.
