= Hawthorne season 2 =

Hawthorne
- Season 2
- DVD cover
- No. of episodes: 10

Release
- Original network: TNT
- Original release: June 22 – August 24, 2010

Season chronology
- ← Previous; Season 1 Next → Season 3

The second season of Hawthorne, premiered on TNT on June 22, 2010. The season contains 10 episodes and concluded airing on August 24, 2010.

== Season synopsis ==
In season two, we discover that Richmond Trinity is closing its doors due to financial ruin. Christina turns down a position to run a private dialysis clinic to become Director of Nursing at James River Hospital, the last hospital in that area and one that is facing closure due to its low quality of care. While originally taking this position under the assumption that she would replace the existing director, we learn that she must split the responsibilities with a head strong, difficult and emotionally burned out nurse who has no intention of working with her and resents her newly appointed position. At the end of season two Christina discovers she is pregnant with Tom's child.

== Cast ==
=== Main cast ===
- Jada Pinkett Smith as Christina Hawthorne, Co. Director of Nursing
- Michael Vartan as Dr. Tom Wakefield, Chief of Surgery
- David Julian Hirsh as Nurse Ray Stein
- Suleka Mathew as Nurse Bobbie Jackson
- Christina Moore as Charge Nurse Candy Sullivan of ICU
- Hannah Hodson as Camille Hawthorne
- Vanessa Lengies as Charge Nurse Kelly Epson of Pediatrics

=== Recurring cast ===
- Anne Ramsay as Dr. Brenda Marshall
- Vanessa Bell Calloway as Gail Strummer, Co. Director of Nursing
- Adam Rayner as Steve Shaw
- James Morrison as John Morrissey, CEO of James River
- Abigail Spencer as Dr. Erin Jameson, Medical Director
- Collins Pennie as Marcus Leeds, ER Clerk
- Kenneth Choi as Paul Hyun, Chief of Surgery
- Aisha Hinds as Isabel Walsh
- Robin Weigert as Sara Adams
- Sara Gilbert as Malia Price

== Production ==
Masius will continue on as executive producer in the second season. In September 2009, Glen Mazzara was named showrunner for the program's second season. Masius decided to name Mazzara as showrunner for the second season, citing a desire to focus more on writing. Pinkett Smith hoped to cast her nine-year-old daughter Willow as a character in the show's second season.

== Episodes ==
| No. overall | No. in season | Title | Directed by | Written by | Original release date | U.S. viewers (millions) |
|---|---|---|---|---|---|---|
| 11 | 1 | "No Excuses" | Jeff Bleckner | Glen Mazzara | June 22, 2010 | 3.42 |
Richmond Trinity has shut down and Christina along with Bobby Jackson, Kelly Epson, Ray Stein, and Tom Wakefield transfer to a new hospital on the verge of being closed itself. Christina is named co director of nursing and clashes with the current director. Christina and Tom's feelings begin to develop. A woman dies due to lack of medical attention. In the end Tom tries to kiss Christina, but she pushes him away.
| 12 | 2 | "The Starting Line" | Ed Bianchi | John Masius & Erica Shelton | June 29, 2010 | 2.95 |
Christina disagrees with the hospital’s plan not to treat a heroin-addicted patient and takes her grievances to the ethics committee. An unexpected illness forces a mother to reveal a potentially life-changing secret to her adoptive son. Camille begins to build a relationship with hospital employee Marcus. Christina wants a do-over with tom, but he's playing hard-to-get.
| 13 | 3 | "Road Narrows" | Ed Bianchi | Sang Kyu Kim | July 6, 2010 | 2.73 |
Christina deals with a bad car accident that injured Tom and Paul and has to find out what caused the grandmother to drive erratically, also Candy returns from Afghanistan earlier than expected. Tom and Christina in the end have sex, because Christina feels bad that tom's friend Paul died.
| 14 | 4 | "Afterglow" | Jeff Bleckner | Darin Goldberg & Shelley Meals | July 13, 2010 | 2.64 |
Christina has difficulty trying to get the only doctor at James River hospital to perform a surgery on a prisoner who killed a pastor because of the doctors religious beliefs, while Tom hopes to get some good new about his elbow.Tom still want Christina to marry him. she says no to marrying Tom.
| 15 | 5 | "The Match" | Mike Robe | Adam E. Fierro & Glen Mazzara | July 20, 2010 | 2.86 |
Christina tries to prepare a mother for the loss of her daughter at any time, due to the fact that the girl needs a kidney transplant but is having trouble finding matches because she is a mixed race.Tom is mad at Christina for saying no to his marriage proposal.
| 16 | 6 | "Final Curtain" | Tricia Brock | Sarah Thorp | July 27, 2010 | 2.63 |
A language barrier hinders the treatment of a pregnant woman from Afghanistan who has taken a fall potentially injuring her baby. Tom prepares to undergo surgery. And Christina catches Camille having sex with Marcus .
| 17 | 7 | "Hidden Truths" | Jeff Bleckner | Darin Goldberg & Shelley Meals | August 3, 2010 | 3.12 |
An old friend resurfaces, and Christina is determined to help her despite the insurance company’s refusal to cover her treatment. Tom’s growing relationship with Erin rubs Christina the wrong way, just as tension and silence build at home between Christina and Camille. Erin kisses Tom . Tom and Christina fight and break up.
| 18 | 8 | "A Mother Knows" | Tricia Brock | Erica Shelton | August 10, 2010 | 3.24 |
Homeless mother Isabel (recurring guest star Aisha Hinds), concerned for the safety of her son in foster care, kidnaps him and disappears. It is up to Christina and Detective Nick Renata (special guest star Marc Anthony) to find her. Tom returns to surgery, while Bobbie and Steve try to help the family of an injured woman. Tom and Erin kiss and Christina goes on a date with nick
| 19 | 9 | "Picture Perfect" | Jeff Bleckner | Adam E. Fierro & Lisa Randolph | August 17, 2010 | 3.79 |
In the wake of a critical situation involving her daughter, Christina turns to Det. Nick Renata (special guest star Marc Anthony) for help. Christina attacks Marcus. tom tells Erin that Christina and him are just friends . Elsewhere, Kelly searches for a mourning mother's camera; Erin and Christina butt heads over Tom's career; and Steve is haunted by a past figure. Sara Gilbert guest stars. Christina tries to tell tom that she still loves him, but chickens out.
| 20 | 10 | "No Exit" | Jeff Bleckner | Story by : Adam E. Fierro & Glen Mazzara; Teleplay by : Glen Mazzara | August 24, 2010 | 3.48 |
An explosion at James River wreaks havoc, Candy is hurt in the explosion. Bobbie and Steve offer truths about their pasts. Tom leaves Erin for Christina. At the end, Christina reveals that she is pregnant.
