= Hawthorne season 3 =

Hawthorne
- Season 3
- DVD cover
- No. of episodes: 10

Release
- Original network: TNT
- Original release: June 14 – August 16, 2011

Season chronology
- ← Previous; Season 2

The third and final season of Hawthorne premiered on TNT on June 14, 2011. The season contained 10 episodes. Season 3 concluded on August 16, 2011 and was cancelled shortly after.

== Season synopsis ==
The third season focuses on Christina and Tom's struggling relationship due to the fact she lost her baby in an assault and she gets even more depressed when she loses her job.

== Cast ==
=== Main cast ===
- Jada Pinkett Smith as Christina Hawthorne, former Chief Nursing Officer of James River, Present COO of James River
- Suleka Mathew as Nurse Bobbie Jackson
- Michael Vartan as Dr. Tom Wakefield
- Hannah Hodson as Camille Hawthorne
- Marc Anthony as Detective Nick Renata
- Vanessa Lengies as Scrub Nurse Kelly Epson
- Adam Rayner as Dr. Steve Shaw

=== Recurring cast ===
- Anne Ramsay as Dr. Brenda Marshall
- Derek Luke as Dr. Miles Bourdet
- James Morrison as John Morrissey, former CEO of James River Hospital
- Vanessa Bell Calloway as Nurse Gail Strummer, former Chief Nursing Officer of James River
- Christina Moore as Candy Sullivan
- Rebecca Field as Susan Winters

== Production ==
On September 14, 2010, TNT renewed Hawthorne for a 10 episode third and final season slated to begin on June 14, 2011. Marc Anthony has joined the main cast beginning with season three. Nurse Ray Stein played by David Julian Hirsh did not return for Season 3. It was left unknown what happened to his character.

== Episodes ==
No. overall	No. in season	Title	Directed by	Written by	Original release date	U.S. viewers (millions)
21	1	"For Better or Worse"	Peter Werner	John Tinker	June 14, 2011	2.58
Christina and Tom's wedding does not go as planned, Nick investigates the cause of an attack at the hospital. Candy finally goes into labor after almost losing her life. Christina and Tom lose the baby.
22	2	"Fight or Flight"	Seith Mann	Sang Kyu Kim	June 21, 2011	2.21
Tom and Christina deal with the explosion at the hospital and her pregnancy differently. Camille may have found a new love interest. Bobbie and Christina argue over hospital duties. Also a little girl is left at the front of the hospital for no apparent reason.
23	3	"Parental Guidance Required"	Mike Robe	Allison Robbins & John Romano	June 28, 2011	2.42
Nick asks Christina for help with his ill mother. Dr. Steve Shaw gets a surprise visit from his father. An internal affairs investigator comes to James River looking into the events surrounding the attack that recently took place. Tom is becoming concerned with Camille's interest in the new doctor at the hospital practicing under Tom. Later that night Christina spends time with Nick and his mother.
24	4	"A Fair to Remember"	Stephen Gyllenhaal	Darin Goldberg & Shelley Meals	July 5, 2011	2.52
Jimmy Dupree is still questioning the nursing staff of James River about the events that led up to the attack and Nick is questioned about the attack that night. James River holds a health fair that leads Kelly to get in an argument with Bobbie over how to continue after a capital MRSA outbreak is suspected. Morrissey begins to fall apart because of stress due to recent events taking place at the hospital. At the end Christina and Tom have a fight but make up fast.
25	5	"Let Freedom Sing"	Adam Kane	Sibyl Gardner	July 12, 2011	2.42
Christina and Tom spend the day with some special kids visiting the hospital. Bobbie is interviewed about James River for an article. Kelly and Dr. Marshall may find they have something in common as they get to know each other better. Investigator Jimmy Dupree questions Nick about the attack to see if the story he tells changes. Brenda tells Christina that she cannot have any more children.
26	6	"Just Between Friends"	Rosemary Rodriguez	Allison Robbins & John Romano	July 19, 2011	2.25
Christina and Nick team up to plan a birthday bash for Mama Renata (Miriam Colon) at the house. Meanwhile, Camille learns a seismic life lesson when she encounters Miles' wife; Bobbie throws a fund-raiser for the cancer lab; Morrissey's troubles hit a fever pitch. At the end of the party Nick finally expresses his feelings for Christina.
27	7	"To Tell the Truth"	Tony Goldwyn	Allison Robbins & Sibyl Gardner	July 26, 2011	2.19
Christina is given a big opportunity after losing her job at the hospital. Camille and Miles have to make a decision about their relationship after learning something about Miles. Bobbie makes a mistake that could cost her the job. Tom's dislike of Nick increases more when Christina explains she slept with Nick. After, she told him he went looking for Nick so at the back of Nick's car Tom waited. When Nick finally showed up Tom put a gun to his head and says stay away from Christina.
28	8	"Price of Admission"	Rosemary Rodriguez	John Tinker	August 2, 2011	2.46
After Christina discovers that life has become too stressful she decides to seek help in the form of therapy. Christina talks about a lot of things from her husband to her childhood. Tom has to keep his friend from thinking that negative thoughts while dealing with an unexpected diagnosis. Later, that night Christina finds Tom in their house. He explains that he wants a divorce. Christina says she going away for a while and asks if she can handle it after she comes back.
29	9	"Signed, Sealed, Delivered"	Rosemary Rodriguez	John Romano	August 9, 2011	2.35
Christina's daughter tries to help her mom through changes her decision will have on those she cares about most. When in the airplane Christina gets a phone call from Nick, he says that his mother just died. Camille will have to tell Miles goodbye after hearing that he has decided to leave the hospital. Tom and Steve get in an argument that decides a patient's life.
30	10	"A Shot in the Dark"	Michael Schultz	Darin Goldberg & Shelley Meals	August 16, 2011	2.87
Christina now runs James River Hospital temporarily so she talks to Morrissey and he says he's not coming back. While Tom hopes the operation for a close friend will save his life or he will just let him die. Kelly has a change in her career at the hospital. After accepting his proposal Bobbie and Steve must decide when to go to London. Camille must decide if the time is right to go to college or stay at the hospital. Tom asks Christina if they can put the past behind them and be friends. Nick comes and talks to Christina asking her if she's scared of him. He puts the gun to his heart and says this is where Christina and him live. After Nick leaves, Christina locks the door and upon hearing a gunshot and she sees a car speeding past that looks like Tom's car. Nick is injured but still breathing and Christina lays with him trying to call for help.
