= Shot in the Dark =

Shot in the Dark may refer to:

== Books ==
- Shot in the Dark, a 1932 novel by Gerard Fairlie
- A Shot in the Dark, a 1952 novel by Richard P. Powell
- A Shot in the Dark, a 1958 novel by David Garnett
- Shots in the Dark: Collected Film Criticism, a 2017 non-fiction book by Jonathan Baumbach
- A Shot in the Dark, a 2018 novel by Lynne Truss
- Shot in the Dark, a 2018 novel by Cleo Coyle
- A Shot in the Dark, a 2019 novel by Matthew Costello with Neil Richards

== Film, television, and theatre ==
=== Film ===
- A Shot in the Dark (1933 film), a British film directed by George Pearson
- A Shot in the Dark (1935 film), an American film directed by Charles Lamont
- A Shot in the Dark (1941 film), a film directed by William C. McGann
- A Shot in the Dark (1947 film), also known as Dragnet and Dark Bullet
- A Shot in the Dark (1964 film), a Pink Panther (Inspector Clouseau) film directed by Blake Edwards
- Shot in the Dark, a 2002 documentary by Adrian Grenier

=== Television ===
==== Episodes ====
- "A Shot in the Dark", 100 Centre Street season 1, episode 9 (2001)
- "A Shot in the Dark", Dark Blue season 1, episode 10 (2009)
- "A Shot in the Dark", Dr. G: Medical Examiner season 2, episode 3 (2005)
- "A Shot in the Dark", Empty Nest season 3, episode 13 (1991)
- "A Shot in the Dark", ER season 11, episode 8 (2004)
- "A Shot in the Dark", Family Guy season 14, episode 9 (2015)
- "A Shot in the Dark", Five Fingers episode 15 (1960)
- "A Shot in the Dark", Forensic Files season 7, episode 9 (2002)
- "A Shot in the Dark", Happy Days season 4, episode 15 (1977)
- "A Shot in the Dark", Hawthorne season 3, episode 10 (2011)
- "A Shot in the Dark", Heartbeat series 9, episode 18 (2000)
- "A Shot in the Dark", Homicide: Life on the Street season 1, episode 5 (1993)
- "A Shot in the Dark", Melrose Place season 6, episode 8 (1997)
- "A Shot in the Dark", Paruvu episode 4 (2024)
- "A Shot in the Dark", Real Crime series 8, episode 6 (2009)
- "A Shot in the Dark", Rizzoli & Isles season 6, episode 18 (2016)
- "A Shot in the Dark (Part 1)" and "A Shot in the Dark (Part 2)", Spin City season 5, episodes 22–23 (2001)
- "A Shot in the Dark", The Brothers Brannagan episode 22 (1961)
- "A Shot in the Dark", The Double Life of Henry Phyfe episode 15 (1966)
- "A Shot in the Dark", The Drew Carey Show season 7, episode 17 (2002)
- "A Shot in the Dark", The Expanse season 4, episode 7 (2019)
- "A Shot in the Dark", The Jungle Book (2010) season 2, episode 32 (2016)
- "A Shot in the Dark", Three Sisters season 2, episode 4 (2001)
- "A Shot in the Dark", Untold Stories of the E.R. season 4, episode 17 (2006)
- "Shot in the Dark", Adventures of Superman season 2, episode 5 (1953)
- "Shot in the Dark", Haven season 4, episode 11 (2013)
- "Shot in the Dark", Holby City series 9, episode 2 (2006)
- "Shot in the Dark", She-Ra and the Princesses of Power season 5, episode 8 (2020)
- "A Shot in the Dark", an episode of Softly, Softly: Task Force series 8, episode 13 (1976)
- "Shot in the Dark", The Detectives season 1, episode 2 (1959)
- "Shot in the Dark", The First 48 season 5, episode 3b (2007)
- "The Shot in the Dark", Bones season 8, episode 15 (2013)

==== Shows ====
- Shot in the Dark (TV series), a 2017 Netflix show

=== Theatre ===
- L'Idiote, or A Shot in the Dark, a play by Marcel Achard, adapted for the 1964 film

== Music ==
=== Bands ===
- Shot in the Dark, a rock band that backed up Al Stewart on several of his albums

=== Albums ===
- Shot in the Dark (album), a 1986 album by Great White
- Shot in the Dark, a 2023 album by Ashley Cooke
- Shot in the Dark, a 1980 album by The Inmates
- Shot in the Dark, a 1977 album by Bill Quateman

=== Songs ===
- "Shot in the Dark" (Ozzy Osbourne song), 1986
- "Shot in the Dark" (AC/DC song), 2020
- "Shot in the Dark" (Within Temptation song), 2011
- "Shot in the Dark", a song by RJD2 from Deadringer
- "Shot in the Dark", a 1986 song by the Canadian band Haywire
- "Shot in the Dark", a 2011 song by the American band Augustana from their self-titled album Augustana
- "Shot in the Dark", a song by Belinda Carlisle from her 1986 album Belinda
- "Shot in the Dark", a 2014 song by The Magic Numbers
- "Shot in the Dark", a 1982 song by Patty Weaver
- "Shot in the Dark", a song by John Mayer from his 2021 album Sob Rock
- "Shot in the Dark", a bonus track by Big Time Rush from Another Life also featured in the band's TV series
- "A Shot in the Dark", a song by Henry Mancini, also performed by Tony Osborne, Joe Loss, The Jets, and Roland Alphonso
- "A Shot in the Dark", a song by A Day to Remember from For Those Who Have Heart

== Other uses ==
- Shot in the dark (drink), a coffee drink

== See also ==
- Bahrain: Shouting in the Dark, a television documentary film produced by the news channel Al Jazeera English about the Bahraini uprising of 2011
