= Nathaniel J. Potvin =

American actor

- Born: Van Nuys, Los Angeles, California, U.S.
- Occupation: Actor
- Years active: 2012–present

Nathaniel James Potvin is an American actor and dancer. He is known for his role as Ryan Walker in the sci-fi adventure comedy television series Mech-X4, Ryan in the sitcom Alexa & Katie and as Wallace Marks in the teen drama Five Points.

== Filmography ==
=== Film ===
Year	Title	Role	Notes
2012	Palms	Solomon Dorsey	short
2013	Twist of Faith	Asher Jones	TV movie
2013	Different	Brandon	short
2019	A World Away	Henry Jefferson	
2019	Cousins	Levi	short
2020	L.I.P.	Trey	short
2020	The Prom	Kevin	

=== Television ===
Year	Title	Role	Notes
2012	Belle's	Jimmy Barnes	Episode: "Birthday Party"
2013	The Middle	Boy in the Hallway	Episode: "Life Skills"
2014	The Haunted Hathaways	Billy	Episode: "Haunted Boo Crew"
2014	Love That Girl!	Jalen	Episode: "Secret Swingers"
2014	Jessie	Shane	Episode: "Acting with the Frenemy"
2014	CSI: Crime Scene Investigation	young Tyson Briggs	Episode: "Dead in His Tracks"
2014	Girl Meets World	Academic Top Half	2 episodes
2016–2018	Mech-X4	Ryan Walker	36 episodes
2018–2020	Alexa & Katie	Ryan	17 episodes
2018–2019	Five Points	Wallace Marks	20 episodes
2018	Spider-Man	Prowler	voice, Episode: "Bring on the Bad Guys: Part Three"
2018	American Vandal	Trevor Gonzalez	3 episodes
