= Mayfair Witches =

2023 American drama television series

- Also known as: Anne Rice's Mayfair Witches
- Genre: Gothic horror; Supernatural; Thriller; Drama
- Created by: Michelle Ashford; Esta Spalding
- Based on: Lives of the Mayfair Witches by Anne Rice
- Showrunner: Esta Spalding
- Starring: Alexandra Daddario; Tongayi Chirisa; Jack Huston; Harry Hamlin; Ben Feldman; Alyssa Jirrels; Betsy Brandt; James Frain; Eliza Scanlen
- Music by: Will Bates
- Country of origin: United States
- Original language: English
- No. of seasons: 2
- No. of episodes: 16

Production
- Executive producers: Michael Uppendahl; Anne Rice; Christopher Rice; Jeff Freilich; Mark Johnson; Michelle Ashford; Esta Spalding; Tom Williams
- Cinematography: Evans Brown; Joseph E. Gallagher; Bob Foster; Hernán Otaño
- Editors: Debra Beth Weinfeld; Andy Morrish; Andrew Wesman
- Running time: 40–60 minutes
- Production companies: Gran Via Productions; Round Two Productions; Pali Eyes Pictures; AMC Studios

Original release
- Network: AMC
- Release: January 8, 2023 – present

Related
- Immortal Universe

Anne Rice's Mayfair Witches, or simply Mayfair Witches, is an American supernatural horror thriller drama television series created by Esta Spalding and Michelle Ashford, based on the novel trilogy Lives of the Mayfair Witches by Anne Rice. The series stars Alexandra Daddario as Rowan Fielding, Harry Hamlin as Cortland Mayfair, Tongayi Chirisa as Ciprien Grieve, and Jack Huston as Lasher.

Mayfair Witches is the second television series set in the Immortal Universe, a shared universe based on Rice's novels, which started in 2022 with Interview with the Vampire. The series premiered on AMC on January 8, 2023. In February 2023, the series was renewed for a second season which premiered on January 5, 2025. In April 2025, the series was renewed for a third season, titled Salem Coven, which is slated to premiere on December 30, 2026.

== Premise ==
Neurosurgeon Dr. Rowan Fielding learns she is the heiress to a dynasty of powerful witches haunted by a sinister spirit.

== Cast and characters ==
=== Main ===
- Alexandra Daddario as Rowan Fielding, a neurosurgeon who learns that she is the heiress to the Mayfair dynasty
- Tongayi Chirisa as Ciprien Grieve, an empath and agent of the Talamasca assigned to Rowan, and a combination of the characters Michael Curry and Aaron Lightner from the novels
- Jack Huston as Lasher, a powerful, shape-shifting entity who has been bound to the Mayfair witches for centuries
- Harry Hamlin as Cortland Mayfair, the current Mayfair patriarch
- Ben Feldman as Sam "Lark" Larkin (season 2), Rowan's former boyfriend, the CEO of a genetics startup
- Alyssa Jirrels as Moira Mayfair (season 2–present), Rowan's cousin who has the power to read minds.
- Betsy Brandt as Katherine (season 3)
- James Frain as Solomon (season 3)
- Eliza Scanlen as Jessica (season 3)
- Omar Maskati as Leo (season 3)

=== Recurring ===
- Beth Grant as Carlotta Mayfair, Deirdre's severe and controlling aunt, and Cortland's sister
- Erica Gimpel as Elena Fielding, Rowan's adoptive mother, secretly a Mayfair cousin who is aware of Rowan's connection to the family
- Annabeth Gish as Deirdre Mayfair, Rowan's biological mother, an invalid plagued by the manipulative Lasher
- Geraldine Singer as Millie Mayfair, Cortland's other sister
- Hannah Alline as Suzanne, a healer in 1681 Donnelaith, Scotland, and the ancestor of the Mayfair witches
- Ravi Naidu as Samir, Ciprien's superior at the Talamasca
- Jen Richards as Josephine "Jojo" Mayfair, Cortland's daughter
- Keyara Milliner as Odette Grieve, Ciprien's sister
- Dennis Boutsikaris as Albrecht, the local leader of the Talamasca
- Charlayne Woodard as Dolly Jean Mayfair, Cortland's cousin
- Suleka Mathew as Arjuna, a Talamasca healer
- Ted Levine as Julien Mayfair (season 2), Cortland and Carlotta's father
- Mariana A. Novak as Polina Vilkov (season 2), a Talamasca agent

In addition, Madison Wolfe guest stars as Tessa, a young Mayfair cousin of Rowan's, Emma Rose Smith co-stars as Florie, Suzanne's younger sister, while Ian Hoch co-stars as Keith Murfis, a coroner and observer of the Mayfairs who becomes involved with an anti-witch cult. In season two, Gabriel Freilich guest stars as the vampire Felix, reprising his role from the second season of Interview with the Vampire.

== Episodes ==
=== Series overview ===
| Season | Season title | Episodes | Originally released | |
| Season | Season title | Episodes | First released | Last released |
|---|---|---|---|---|
| 1 | — | 8 | January 8, 2023 | February 26, 2023 |
| 2 | — | 8 | January 5, 2025 | March 2, 2025 |
| 3 | Salem Coven | TBA | December 30, 2026 | TBA |

=== Season 1 (2023) ===
| No. overall | No. in season | Title | Directed by | Written by | Original release date | U.S. viewers (millions) |
|---|---|---|---|---|---|---|
| 1 | 1 | "The Witching Hour" | Michael Uppendahl | Michelle Ashford & Esta Spalding | January 8, 2023 | 0.577 |
San Francisco pediatric neurosurgeon Dr. Rowan Fielding learns that her adoptive mother Elena's cancer has returned. When Rowan's chief surgeon refuses to help her get Elena into a clinical trial, she envisions the arteries inside of his head, and he collapses. Rowan's belief that she somehow caused the incident is dismissed by Elena, who secretly makes a call to the Talamasca for help. Empath Ciprien Grieve, the Talamasca agent assigned to Rowan, reassures Elena that "the man" remains in New Orleans. Rowan loses her temper, and this time the man she is arguing with dies. In New Orleans, Dr. Vernon Lamb secretively withholds Thorazine from a catatonic Deirdre Mayfair so he can give his new patient a proper psychiatric exam. Elena dies, and the entity Lasher, bound to Deirdre, appears to Rowan. In the past, young Deirdre is guarded closely by her stern aunt Carlotta, but Mayfair patriarch Cortland hires a young man to seduce her. She becomes pregnant and is saved from suicide by "the man", an entity known to the Mayfairs as Lasher. Deirdre gives birth, but Carlotta hands baby Rowan over to her niece, Elena, with strict instructions to disappear with the child and never return.
| 2 | 2 | "The Dark Place" | Michael Uppendahl | Michael Goldbach | January 15, 2023 | 0.584 |
A grieving Rowan learns that Elena lied about trying to find her birth parents, and spirals further. Though instructed by the Talamasca to only surveil Rowan, Ciprien approaches her and promises answers when the chaos around her escalates. He touches her and collapses from the empathic shock. Rowan looks through his phone and sees photos of Deirdre and Elena. Ciprien awakens in the ambulance and flees. Rowan makes her way to New Orleans just as Deirdre awakens, feigning catatonia for Carlotta. Dr. Lamb promises to help free her, but Deirdre cannot wait. Lasher, who has been kept closely bound to Deirdre due to her drugged state, reassures her that her daughter is alive and coming to her. The Mayfair maid Delphine lets Deirdre escape to Cortland, where she uses magic to see Rowan's location through Lasher's eyes. Carlotta is shocked when a lucid Deirdre enters the Pontchartrain Hotel. Deirdre dismisses Carlotta's attempt to bring her home, reminding Carlotta that if she is awake, so is Lasher. Ciprien arranges to meet Rowan at the hotel. On her way to the lobby to meet him, an elevator opens and Rowan comes face to face with Deirdre, who suddenly collapses, her throat slit.
| 3 | 3 | "Second Line" | Axelle Carolyn | Sarah Cornwell | January 22, 2023 | 0.562 |
In the wake of Deirdre's death, a blood-covered Rowan rebuffs Carlotta and leaves the hotel with Ciprien. He tells her about himself, the Talamasca, and Lasher. Carlotta and her sister Millie decide to have a wake for Deirdre to lure Rowan to them. A vengeful Lasher comes to a fearful Cortland, who reminds him that Rowan is the 13th Mayfair witch. Carlotta locks Delphine in the basement with the jeweled key necklace that bound Lasher to Deirdre. Rowan meets Ciprien's pregnant sister, Odette. Rowan receives a spiked drink at a carnival-like funeral on the street. This enables Lasher to come to her as a mysterious attractive stranger. He later impersonates Deirdre, but Rowan is not fooled for long. Lasher kills Delphine by making her bash her head against the cellar wall to free himself from her. Ciprien touches Deirdre's dead body at the morgue and has a vision of a man getting into the elevator with her.
| 4 | 4 | "Curiouser and Curiouser" | Axelle Carolyn | Lindsey Villarreal | January 29, 2023 | 0.530 |
Carlotta finds Delphine's body, but the necklace is missing. Rowan and Ciprien attend Deirdre's funeral. At the Mayfair house on First Street, Carlotta confesses that she sent Rowan away to save her from Lasher. The Talamasca find the man hired to kill Deirdre, but Lasher tortures and then kills him. Rowan meets some of her relatives and learns from Cortland's daughter Jojo that she is the "designee", the Mayfair heir. Jojo explains that there were 12 before Rowan and shows her 12 paintings of these women wearing the key necklace. Cortland encourages Rowan to talk to Lasher. Carlotta is upset to see Rowan wearing Lasher's necklace, and has a servant lock herself and Rowan in the dining room with the paintings. She utters an exorcism-like prayer and sets the room on fire. Ciprien breaks through the door but is stabbed by Carlotta who was aiming for Rowan. Lasher appears to a fearful Carlotta, declaring that Rowan is already his.
| 5 | 5 | "The Thrall" | Haifaa Al-Mansour | Sean Reycraft | February 5, 2023 | 0.574 |
Ciprien and Rowan are disoriented and trapped in the First Street house by Lasher's magic. Ciprien's stab wound has become infected, but Rowan cannot break out of the house. Lasher distracts Rowan by coming to her in the form of a healed Ciprien, but the spell is broken when she notices he is not wearing gloves, as Ciprien would. Ciprien has a vision of his predecessor Stuart Townsend, a Talamasca agent who was assigned to Deirdre's mother, Antha Mayfair, but disappeared. Stuart warns Ciprien not to die in the Mayfair house, or Lasher will trap him there forever. Rowan sees a distraught Millie, who is revealed to be a ghost, and leads Rowan to Delphine's body in the basement. Rowan promises Lasher she will stay with him if he releases Ciprien, which he does. Odette finds a dying Ciprien in his apartment, and Samir, Ciprien's superior at the Talamasca, brings a healer to save him. Rowan resists Lasher's machinations and frees Carlotta from suspension. She then takes Rowan to a balcony and says the only way to escape Lasher is to commit suicide. Rowan realizes that Carlotta killed Antha (or at least encouraged her to jump from the balcony too) and angrily uses her powers to force Carlotta over the balcony to her death.
| 6 | 6 | "Transference" | Haifaa Al-Mansour | Mary Angélica Molina | February 12, 2023 | 0.274 |
Tessa Mayfair tells Rowan about a growing conspiracy against witches like them and encourages Rowan to use her new powers. Rowan wants nothing to do with any of it. She seeks advice from Cortland about getting rid of Lasher and realizes that Cortland has ALS. Cortland thinks his cousin Dolly Jean Mayfair may know how Lasher was once transferred from Mary Beth Mayfair to her brother Julien, Cortland's father. The man in the morgue steals Deirdre's heart and gives it to the anti-witch cult. Ciprien touches Lasher's necklace, and has a vision of the Mayfair ancestor Suzanne, a healer, tried as a witch in 1681 Donnelaith, Scotland, by the Witchfinder. As a last resort, she uses "wicked words" of power, which summon Lasher. He stuns Cip, then strangles the Witchfinder with his own jeweled key necklace. Lastly, he gives Suzanne the key to unlock her cage. Jojo and Dolly Jean gather Tessa, Alicia, and other Mayfair women to perform a ritual that employs a fetish doll made from bones or hair from every designee, including Deirdre. Special words of power call Lasher, and Rowan chokes up the key necklace. The women believe Lasher has chosen Tessa as Rowan's successor and the necklace is placed on her. Losing the necklace traps Ciprien in the past. The anti-witch cult abducts Tessa, and Lasher does not come to her aid.
| 7 | 7 | "Tessa" | Alexis Ostrander | Sarah Cornwell & Esta Spalding | February 19, 2023 | 0.490 |
Rowan realizes she is pregnant. The cult holds Tessa in a cage as their captive at an old auto parts factory. She tries to use her power to coerce one of them, Keith, to unlock her but fails. Rowan seeks out Tessa but finds that she is missing. The Mayfairs summon a scry to find her. Rowan feels responsible for Tessa's predicament but refuses to try and summon Lasher to help them. Lasher tells Ciprien he will never escape the vision, but Ciprien poisons himself with henbane and wakes up in the present. Aware that Rowan is pregnant, Cortland calls his associate, Talamasca leader Albrecht, who stops Ciprien from intervening. Albrecht explains that Rowan is about to make a choice that will fulfill an ancient prophecy and begin "a new era". As the cultists threaten to burn Tessa alive, Rowan arrives and begins killing them. Rowan is shot but saves Tessa from the flames. Keith appears and shoots Tessa, mortally wounding her. Rowan puts on the necklace and calls Lasher.
| 8 | 8 | "What Rough Beast" | Alexis Ostrander | Esta Spalding | February 26, 2023 | 0.443 |
Commanded by a wounded Rowan, Lasher burns Keith alive. Cortland refuses to tell Jojo the truth behind his obsession with Rowan. Ciprien discovers that Cortland ordered Deirdre's murder, and any psychic trace at the crime scene was wiped by the Talamasca. Lasher draws Rowan into a vision, where she learns she can heal herself and others, and they have sex. After Odette calls the Talamasca looking for a missing Ciprien, they erase her memories of recent events. Ciprien touches a mask owned by Cortland, learning that Cortland raped Deirdre and fathered Rowan. Jojo is horrified, and takes Ciprien to the First Street house. He touches the designee fetish doll, seeing a vision of Lasher's prophecy, "the 13th witch is the doorway". While Rowan is trapped in the vision counting down to midnight, "the witching hour", her pregnancy has accelerated and Cortland takes her unconscious body to the Mayfair mausoleum. Rowan awakens with the knowledge that Lasher will be reborn via her child. She goes into labor, and the spirit of Suzanne helps deliver the baby. Rowan turns Cortland to stone for raping Deirdre. Ciprien tries to take the child, but Rowan leaves with her baby.

=== Season 2 (2025) ===
| No. overall | No. in season | Title | Directed by | Written by | Original release date | U.S. viewers (millions) |
|---|---|---|---|---|---|---|
| 9 | 1 | "Lasher" | Colin Bucksey | Esta Spalding | January 5, 2025 | 0.249 |
Rowan, now possessing most of Lasher's powers, tries to "raise" him, but is frustrated by his enormous appetite, prodigious strength, and his incredibly rapid growth. After acquiring some of his blood, she surreptitiously conducts genetic testing. In the process, she discovers that her healing power has also been supercharged, and tells JoJo that she will accept a job at the Mayfair family's hospital. Dolly Jean encourages Lasher's growth and protects him and Rowan from Moira, Tessa's mind-reading sister who blames Lasher for Tessa's death. Ciprien takes steps to prevent his memory being erased again, but learns that the Talamasca now wish to capture Lasher and want him to spearhead the operation. When he is about a week old, Lasher becomes a teenager and tries to have sex with a girl at a street festival, but kills her in the process. Rowan sorrowfully disposes of the body, revealed to be a Mayfair cousin, and locks Lasher in the basement, but he escapes shortly after reaching full maturity.
| 10 | 2 | "Ten of Swords" | Logan Kibens | Sarah Cornwell | January 12, 2025 | 0.330 |
Rowan is reeling from Gifford's death, determined to find Lasher before he can hurt anyone else. Meanwhile, Lasher, now fully human, struggles with his own desires, which spiral dangerously out of control, leading to deadly encounters with the Mayfair women. Ciprien teams up with Moira Mayfair, who is desperate for answers about Lasher and her family's dark history. Rowan contemplates freeing Cortland, who remains imprisoned in his stone form. Within this confinement, he endures tormenting visions of his father, Julien, who berates him for his perceived failures.
| 11 | 3 | "Cover the Mirrors" | Logan Kibens | Megan Mostyn-Brown | January 19, 2025 | 0.264 |
Lasher meets a vampire named Felix in Jackson Square who encourages him to go by not humanity's rules but his instincts. Rowan enlists Cortland and Dolly Jean to help her bring family members to the First Street House to lure Lasher back to her. Moira is convinced by Ciprien and Albrecht to attend the Mayfair gathering to provide intel on Lasher so the Talamasca can capture him. Lasher visits a bar owned by Evelyn Mayfair with disastrous results. Moira challenges Rowan's authority in front of the other Mayfairs by stating Lasher is not in the house, prompting Rowan to confront Moira privately. Rowan accidentally entraps Jojo and Daphne in a thrall in the First Street House once Lasher is around. Rowan confronts Lasher in the street to kill him, but hesitates only to be sprayed by the queller machine Ciprien intended for Lasher. The Talamasca takes Lasher away while a helpless Rowan can only look on.
| 12 | 4 | "Double Helix" | Sarah O'Gorman | Cat Davidson | January 26, 2025 | 0.215 |
Suffering side effects from the queller spray, Rowan flashes back to when she and Lark were together while fixing the Sweet Christine. An angry Moira wakes Rowan up to note Jojo and Daphne are still trapped in a thrall. Rowan meets with Lark for breakfast, but their reconnection is interrupted by Moira's calling about the First Street House falling apart. Rowan and Moira contact Ciprien asking to bring Lasher back, only to find out Albrecht took him somewhere else. Ciprien is later "arrested" by Talamasca agent Polina from Amsterdam regarding Albrecht's betrayal. Desperate to know where Lasher is, Moira and Rowan team up to question Dolly Jean and Evelyn regarding the Victrola and Julien. After touching the Victrola herself, Moira gives a cryptic message regarding the Taltos. Realizing they need to contact Julien's spirit regarding Lasher, Rowan decides to go under a spell involving the Victrola.
| 13 | 5 | "Julien's Victrola" | Sarah O'Gorman | Sean Reycraft | February 2, 2025 | 0.231 |
Under the Victrola's spell, Rowan is tricked by Julien, separating herself into Mind Rowan (intellect) and Heart Rowan (feelings), the former being stuck in the Victrola while the latter stays with Moira, Cortland, and Dolly Jean. Mind Rowan interrogates Julien regarding the Taltos' connection to Donnelaith as well as his history with Lasher. Not realizing only Heart Rowan is back with them, Moira decides to help Cortland regain memories regarding his time in Scotland as a child, revealing he has a half-brother named Ian. Heart Rowan deals with Lark, who approaches her at First Street regarding her genetic make-up. Heart Rowan admits to Lark she's a witch. Realizing there's something amiss, Heart Rowan discovers she's incomplete and performs the Latin incantation to bring her intellect back from the Victrola. Before Mind Rowan leaves the Victrola, she discovers from Julien that Donnelaith is now known as Kilbride. Once Rowan's mind and heart are reunited, she asks Lark to come with her to Kilbride. The end of the episode reveals Lasher is at Kilbride in Ian's castle thanks to Albrecht. Ian kills Albrecht to tie up any loose ends.
| 14 | 6 | "Michaelmas" | Logan Kibens | Sarah Cornwell | February 16, 2025 | 0.179 |
Rowan, Moira, Lark, and Cortland travel to Kilbride Scotland to find Lasher. Once they reach their destination, they realize they arrived in the middle of a Michaelmas celebration. Moira is mysteriously separated from the group. Meanwhile, Lasher meets his intended bride, the female Taltos Emaleth. Rowan, Lark, and Cortland try to find Moira with little help from the townsfolk and are taken by Ian's son Hamish to the Scottish Mayfair castle. Despite Lark's protests, Rowan and Cortland decide to stay with the Scottish Mayfairs to gain intel on Moira's and Lasher's whereabouts. Rowan meets Bonnie Mayfair, who tells her the story of Saint Ashlar and his connection to Kilbride. Rowan tries to convince Ian to bring Lasher to her by using her biokinesis powers only to have the effects be passed on to Bonnie because she is the last "stitched in". Disturbed by the Scottish Mayfairs twisted behavior, Lark tries to convince Rowan to leave. Rowan calms Lark down and convinces for him to stay. Based on Hamish's information she gained earlier from the Michaelmas party, Rowan goes down to the tunnels below the castle, only to be locked in by Hamish. In Amsterdam, Ciprien has been cleared by the Talamasca Elders and demands better treatment in order for cooperation regarding Albrecht's betrayal and finding Lasher.
| 15 | 7 | "A Tangled Web" | Logan Kibens | Mark Lafferty | February 23, 2025 | 0.307 |
Rowan uses her fire power to navigate through the tunnels, eventually running into Amintha (Ian's wife), who shows her where Moira is kept. Rowan convinces Moira to stay in her cell, so the Scottish Mayfairs don't grow suspicious. Meanwhile, Rose Mayfair performs the stitching spell on Lark while he's sleeping in his room. Rowan reunites with Lasher and tells her of his past life as Ashlar and his wish to marry Emaleth. In Amsterdam, Ciprien is granted head of Talamasca New Orleans division & charged to investigate Lasher in Scotland with Polina. Cortland is convinced by Ian to go under the Victrola spell to confront Julien, only for Julien to take his body & leave Cortland's spirit stuck in the Victrola. Rowan reluctantly attends Lasher and Emaleth's wedding where she meets up with Julien (now in Cortland's body) and Lark. After the strange wedding ceremony is completed, Lasher and Emaleth are freed to mate under the curtained gazebo by cheering guests. Shocked at scene, Rowan tries to stop the proceedings only to be held back by Ian, who threatens Lark's life via stitching spell.
| 16 | 8 | "The Innocents" | Logan Kibens | Brandon Martin & Esta Spalding | March 2, 2025 | 0.217 |
Julien (in Cortland's body) gives Rowan drugged tea; she is taken to an underground cell where she meets Ciprien and Polina, who were captured earlier. While Emaleth is in labor, Lasher is convinced to go to the woods with Julien and Ian for a ceremony, only for Ian to slit his throat and gathers his blood. Moira escapes from her cell and disguises herself, finding out through her telepathy the horrific plans for Lasher and Emaleth children. Rowan, Ciprien and Polina escape and find Lasher in the woods. Rowan revives him with her healing powers while Ciprien and Polina call for back up. Moira reveals the Scottish Mayfair's plans to Rowan and Lasher. Lasher, Rowan and Moira confront Ian and Julien regarding the Taltos children. Julien reveals the stitching spell has been broken, leaving the Scottish Mayfairs vulnerable. Lasher and Rowan fight off Ian and other Mayfairs, while Moira and Lark try to get the Taltos children. Amintha kills Lasher with an axe in the chest. Julien discovers Ciprien and Polina have taken the Taltos children and summons lightning, killing Polina. Rowan confronts Julien, only for him to disappear. Rowan drinks Lasher's blood, gaining more magical power. Lark states he cannot be a part of the "war" Rowan is preparing between her and Julien. Rowan makes a tea for Lark to drink so he can forget her & anything involving the Mayfairs. Rowan and Moira arrive back home in New Orleans, bringing back Daphne and Jojo from the thrall.

=== Season 3: Salem Coven ===
| No. overall | No. in season | Title | Directed by | Written by | Original release date | U.S. viewers (millions) |
|---|---|---|---|---|---|---|
| 17 | 1 | TBA | TBA | Thomas Schnauz & Esta Spalding | December 30, 2026 | TBD |

== Production ==
=== Development ===
Development rights to Anne Rice's Lives of the Mayfair Witches book series were still held by Warner Bros in December 2019 when Rice began shopping a package combining film and TV rights to both The Vampire Chronicles and Mayfair Witches. Rice was reportedly asking around $30 to $40 million, plus a $2.5 million buyout of Warner Bros.' rights, and the new owner would hold the rights in perpetuity, not just as an option. In May 2020, it was announced that AMC had acquired the rights to The Vampire Chronicles and Lives of the Mayfair Witches for developing film and television projects. Anne and Christopher Rice would serve as executive producers on any projects developed. Anne Rice said, "It's always been my dream to see the worlds of my two biggest series united under a single roof so that filmmakers could explore the expansive and interconnected universe of my vampires and witches. That dream is now a reality, and the result is one of the most significant and thrilling deals of my long career."

In December 2021, Deadline Hollywood reported that Anne Rice's Mayfair Witches had been given an eight-episode series order by AMC, with another Rice series, Interview with the Vampire, already in production at the network. Mayfair Witches will be written by Esta Spalding and Michelle Ashford, who would both serve as executive producers alongside Mark Johnson. Spalding and Ashford said, "The world of witches has fascinated and terrified for centuries, and yet Anne Rice's particular lens on witches explored something new altogether—women who are powerful, and often brutal, and always committed to subverting our current power structures." Johnson added, "My good fortune as an executive producer of Anne Rice's Interview with the Vampire has now been more than doubled with what Esta Spalding and Michelle Ashford are imagining with The Mayfair Witches. While both shows couldn't be more different, they nevertheless find themselves bound under the same bewitching and engaging umbrella." In January 2023, at AMC's TCA press tour, Johnson announced a crossover between Mayfair Witches and Interview with the Vampire was in discussions.

On February 3, 2023, AMC renewed the series for a second season. On April 9, 2025, AMC renewed the series for a third season and added Thomas Schnauz as a co-showrunner.

=== Casting ===
In March 2022, Variety reported that Alexandra Daddario had been cast in the lead role of Dr. Rowan Fielding. Dan McDermott, president of entertainment and AMC Studios for AMC Networks, said "Alexandra is a singular talent who has lit up the screen in everything she's been in and we couldn't be happier to have her on board, leading the cast of a series that will be a centerpiece of an expanding Anne Rice universe on AMC+ and AMC. We found our Rowan and can't wait for her to meet viewers later this year". Harry Hamlin joined the cast that same month as patriarch Cortland Mayfair. In April 2022, AMC announced the casting of series regular Tongayi Chirisa as Ciprien Grieve, as well as Annabeth Gish as Deirdre Mayfair, Beth Grant as Carlotta Mayfair, Erica Gimpel as Ellie Mayfair and Jen Richards as Jojo, in recurring roles. In May 2022, Jack Huston was cast as Lasher, described as one of Rice's "most mysterious and sensual characters—a powerful, shape-shifting entity who has been bound to the Mayfair witches for hundreds of years".

Alyssa Jirrels joined the second season as a series regular, playing Rowan's cousin Moira Mayfair. She is described as a mind reader "who blames the family and Lasher for the death of her sister Tessa". Ted Levine was cast in a recurring guest starring role as Julien Mayfair, Cortland and Carlotta's father, and "a master manipulator". Thora Birch guest stars as Gifford Mayfair, "a self-deprecating tarot card reader". Ben Feldman was cast as Sam Larkin, the CEO of a genetics startup and Rowan's former boyfriend. In October 2025, Betsy Brandt joined the cast as new series regular for the third season. In November 2025, James Frain and Eliza Scanlen were cast as new series regulars for the third season. In December 2025, Omar Maskati joined the cast as a series regular for the third season.

=== Filming ===
Filming of the first season of Mayfair Witches took place in New Orleans from April 25 to August 26, 2022. The second season was scheduled to film from January 29 to April 5, 2024. Filming for the third season began on October 20, 2025, and concluded on February 20, 2026, in Vancouver, British Columbia.

== Release ==
Like Interview with the Vampire, the series premiered on AMC+ and the AMC linear network, with intended releases announced for late 2022 and then January 5, 2023. The first season premiered on January 8, 2023, and consists of eight episodes. The second season premiered on January 5, 2025. The third season, titled Salem Coven, is scheduled to premiere on December 30, 2026.

In Australia, ABC Television premiered the series on their free-to-air channel as well as streaming service ABC iview on May 5, 2023, along with Interview with the Vampire.

== Reception ==
=== Critical response ===
For the first season, the review aggregator website Rotten Tomatoes reported a 47% approval rating with an average rating of 5.9/10, based on 36 critic reviews. The website's critics consensus reads, "Mayfair Witches has competent gloss and a likable lead in Alexandra Daddario, but this brew is made up of too many derivative elements to conjure a compelling spell of its own." Metacritic, which uses a weighted average, assigned a score of 47 out of 100 based on 13 critics, indicating "mixed or average reviews". On Rotten Tomatoes, the second season holds an approval rating of 71% approval rating with an average rating of 6.9/10, based on 7 critic reviews.

=== Ratings ===
==== Season 1 ====
Viewership and ratings per episode of Mayfair Witches
| No. | Title | Air date | Rating (18–49) | Viewers (millions) | DVR (18–49) | DVR viewers (millions) | Total (18–49) | Total viewers (millions) |
|---|---|---|---|---|---|---|---|---|
| 1 | "The Witching Hour" | January 8, 2023 | 0.11 | 0.577 | —N/a | —N/a | —N/a | 1.7 |
| 2 | "The Dark Place" | January 15, 2023 | 0.11 | 0.584 | —N/a | —N/a | —N/a | —N/a |
| 3 | "Second Line" | January 22, 2023 | 0.06 | 0.562 | —N/a | —N/a | —N/a | —N/a |
| 4 | "Curiouser and Curiouser" | January 29, 2023 | 0.07 | 0.530 | —N/a | —N/a | —N/a | —N/a |
| 5 | "The Thrall" | February 5, 2023 | 0.10 | 0.574 | —N/a | —N/a | —N/a | —N/a |
| 6 | "Transference" | February 12, 2023 | 0.06 | 0.274 | —N/a | —N/a | —N/a | —N/a |
| 7 | "Tessa" | February 19, 2023 | 0.11 | 0.490 | —N/a | —N/a | —N/a | —N/a |
| 8 | "What Rough Beast" | February 26, 2023 | 0.08 | 0.443 | —N/a | —N/a | —N/a | —N/a |

==== Season 2 ====
Viewership and ratings per episode of Mayfair Witches
| No. | Title | Air date | Rating (18–49) | Viewers (millions) |
|---|---|---|---|---|
| 1 | "Lasher" | January 5, 2025 | 0.02 | 0.249 |
| 2 | "Ten of Swords" | January 12, 2025 | 0.05 | 0.330 |
| 3 | "Cover the Mirrors" | January 19, 2025 | 0.04 | 0.264 |
| 4 | "Double Helix" | January 26, 2025 | 0.02 | 0.215 |
| 5 | "Julien's Victrola" | February 2, 2025 | 0.02 | 0.231 |
| 6 | "Michaelmas" | February 16, 2025 | 0.02 | 0.179 |
| 7 | "A Tangled Web" | February 23, 2025 | 0.05 | 0.307 |
| 8 | "The Innocents" | March 2, 2025 | 0.02 | 0.217 |

=== Accolades ===
Awards and nominations received by Mayfair Witches
| Award | Year (Note: The listed year refers to the date of the ceremony.) | Category | Nominee(s) | Result | Ref. |
|---|---|---|---|---|---|
| Saturn Awards | 2024 | Best Fantasy Television Series | Mayfair Witches | Nominated | |
| Saturn Awards | 2026 | Best Fantasy Television Series | Mayfair Witches | Nominated | |
