= St. Urbain's Horseman (TV series) =

St. Urbain's Horseman is a Canadian television drama miniseries, broadcast on CBC Television in the 2007–2008 television season. Based on the novel by Mordecai Richler, the series starred David Julian Hirsh, Selina Giles, Elliott Gould and Andrea Martin. It was directed by Peter Moss.
