= Mech-X4 =

American TV series

- Genre: Sci-fi; Adventure; Comedy
- Created by: Steve Marmel
- Starring: Nathaniel Potvin; Raymond Cham; Kamran Lucas; Pearce Joza; Alyssa Jirrels
- Composer: Tim Wynn
- Country of origin: United States
- Original language: English
- No. of seasons: 2
- No. of episodes: 35

Production
- Executive producers: Steve Marmel; Anupam Nigam; Brian Hamilton
- Producer: Ian Hay
- Camera setup: Multi-camera
- Running time: 21–23 minutes
- Production company: Bay City Productions

Original release
- Network: Disney Channel; Disney XD
- Release: November 11, 2016 – August 20, 2018

Mech-X4 is an American science fiction adventure comedy television series created by Steve Marmel that aired on Disney Channel from November 11 to December 4, 2016, and on Disney XD from April 17, 2017 to August 20, 2018. The series stars Nathaniel Potvin, Raymond Cham, Kamran Lucas, Pearce Joza, and Alyssa Jirrels.

== Premise ==
Ryan Walker is a freshman at Bay City High who has the ability to control technology with his mind. His talent mysteriously awakens Mech-X4, a giant 150-foot robot built by an elusive genius-in-hiding to defend their city against impending doom. Ryan recruits his older brother and two best friends to help him operate Mech-X4. When giant monsters suddenly begin to descend upon Bay City, the four must quickly learn to work as a team in order to pilot the robot that is their only hope of saving the city and world from mass destruction.

== Cast and characters ==
=== Main ===
- Nathaniel Potvin as Ryan Walker, a technopath who serves as the pilot for Mech-X4. He discovers in the first season that he was adopted, and that his biological parents gave him up because they were on the run from Seth Harper.
- Raymond Cham as Mark Walker, Ryan's older brother who serves as the mechanic for Mech-X4. He is very popular and is a star athlete.
- Kamran Lucas as Harris Harris Jr., Ryan's friend who operates the DM shields and defenses for Mech-X4. He is very intelligent and a talented inventor.
- Pearce Joza as Spyder, Ryan's friend who operates the weapons for Mech-X4. He is dimwitted and often acts on impulse.
- Alyssa Jirrels as Veracity, a student at Ryan's school who has two fathers and is Harris's academic rival. When Harris breaks his arm, the team recruits Veracity to temporarily take over his role. In the first season, she is a recurring character, but she is promoted to a main character in the second season.

=== Recurring ===
- Ali Liebert as Principal Grey, the school principal who is secretly behind the monster attacks working for Seth Harper. In the second season, she works with Traeger. Her desk secretly has equipment that enables her to combine the DNA of two animals to form a giant monster. Grey later gained the ability to turn into a Clawboon at will.
- Peter Benson as Seth Harper, the billionaire CEO of Harper Futuristics who dates Grace Walker in the first season. In "Let's Get Leo!" he is revealed to be the true mastermind behind the monster attacks, believing that mankind has polluted and destroyed the Earth and needs to be destroyed for the benefit of the planet. In the second season, the Mech-X4 team reluctantly accept his help in improving Mech-X4 to be able to battle Traeger.
- Ryan Beil as Leo, the creator of Mech-X4. His experiments on Ryan's biological parents are the cause of Ryan's technopathic abilities. He used to be close friends with Seth Harper before they became enemies due to Harper's creation of monsters to destroy mankind.
- Alyssa Lynch as Cassie, a reporter for the student newspaper.
- Crystal Balint as Grace Walker, Mark's mother and Ryan's adoptive mother who works as a cook on a food truck.
- John De Santis as Davage, Principal Grey's partner who helps her try to get rid of Mech-X4. When working for Principal Grey and Seth Harper, he posed as the school janitor.
- Dan Payne as Traeger, the main villain of the second season; he was created as a result of the fight between Mech-X4 and Seth Harper's monster. Traeger can shapeshift at will into a reptilian creature.

== Production ==
In March 2015, Deadline announced an upcoming Disney XD pilot titled MTX!, which was expected to be filmed in June. In January 2016, the series was reannounced as Mech-X4. Spyder was the only character recast following the original pilot, in which he was played by Robbie Tucker. Pearce Joza had previously auditioned for the role but was rejected for being too short, eventually being cast once the series was greenlit.

The series was renewed for a second season ahead of its season one premiere on September 1, 2016. The second season premiered on Disney XD on September 9, 2017.

== Episodes ==
=== Series overview ===
| Season | Episodes | Originally released | |
| Season | Episodes | First released | Last released |
|---|---|---|---|
| 1 | 15 | November 11, 2016 | May 1, 2017 |
| 2 | 20 | September 9, 2017 | August 20, 2018 |

=== Season 1 (2016–17) ===
| No. overall | No. in season | Title | Directed by | Written by | Original release date | Prod. code | U.S. viewers (millions) |
|---|---|---|---|---|---|---|---|
| 1 | 1 | "Let's Call It MECH-X4!" | Zach Lipovsky | Steve Marmel | November 11, 2016 | 101–102 | 1.26 |
Ryan Walker, a high school freshman, discovers he has technopathy – the ability to control technology with his mind. His newfound powers awaken Mech-X4, a 150-foot robot that he is able to control and defend Bay City High when a monster descends upon the school. Ryan enlist his two best friends, Spyder, Harris, and his brother Mark to help him operate the robot. Afterwards, billionaire CEO of Harper Futuristics, Seth Harper becomes intrigued by the robot and decides to meet it. However, Principal Grey, principal of Bay City High and the one making the monster by mixing animal DNA, deploys another monster that Mech-X4 force it to retreat but almost at the cost of Harris' life. Guest stars: Ali Liebert as Principal Grey, Peter Benson as Harper, Ryan Beil as Leo, Alyssa Lynch as Cassie, Crystal Balint as Grace
| 2 | 2 | "Let's Get Some Air!" | Adam Stein | Anupam Nigam | November 12, 2016 | 103 | 1.24 |
The crew of Mech-X4 traces the tentacle monster and kills it. However, some ooze from the monster's prior death covers Harris. The ooze slowly turns Harris into a raged monster when his tempers rise, so the team goes on a mission to find a cure. Later, Leo is revealed to be alive and held captive by the mysterious mastermind. Guest star: Ali Liebert as Principal Grey, Alyssa Lynch as Cassie, John De Santis as Davage, Peter Benson as Harper, Ryan Beil as Leo
| 3 | 3 | "Let's Open the Monster Heart!" | Adam Stein | Teleplay by : George Strayton; Story by : Steve Marmel | November 13, 2016 | 104 | 1.14 |
After failing to crack open the monster's heart retrieved from a dead monster, the team sneak into the Harper Futuristic headquarters by causing a false alarm. They get access to a powerful laser that crack opens the heart. However, Grey, dressed as a ninja, takes the heart from Ryan, who wears a hood to conceal his identity, after threatening to harm Mark. Eventually, Harper and security catch them. However, they get away with their mischievous deeds when Harper shows love interest in Ryan and Mark's mother Grace Walker. Later, Grey deduces Ryan as Mech-X4's main pilot. Guest stars: Ali Liebert as Principal Grey, Peter Benson as Harper, John De Santis as Davage, Crystal Balint as Grace, Kazumi Evans as Jessica
| 4 | 4 | "Let's Be Idiots!" | Kaare Andrews | Michael Rowe | November 27, 2016 | 105 | 0.86 |
Guest stars: Ali Liebert as Principal Grey, Peter Benson as Harper, Crystal Balint as Grace, John De Santis as Davage
| 5 | 5 | "Let's Survive in the Woods!" | Kaare Andrews | Kyle Mack | December 4, 2016 | 106 | 0.98 |
Guest stars: Ali Liebert as Principal Grey, Rohan Campbell as Dane, John De Santis as Davage, Peter Benson as Harper
| 6 | 6 | "Let's Get Our Robot Back!" | Eric Dean Seaton | George Strayton | April 17, 2017 | 107 | 0.15 |
Ryan, Spyder and Harris attempt to rescue Mark and reclaim Mech-X4 from Grey and her forces. Ryan unlocks the ability to control the robot from outside. Meanwhile, Grey and her assistant Davage fail to interrogate Mark for answers about the other pilots of Mech-X4. Mark escapes Davage, puts their systems offline and reunites with his friends before assembling in the robot to defeat a monster summoned by Grey. The team learn that Grey is evil. During the battle, Davage dies and The Mastermind, who was scheduled to make a visit, retreats upon arrival after witnessing the chaos.In the aftermath, Ryan returns home and finds Grey talking to his mother. Grey warns Ryan about the Mastermind's plan to end the world and join forces after fearing for her own life. Guest stars: Ali Liebert as Principal Grey, John De Santis as Davage, Peter Benson as Harper, Crystal Balint as Grace, Fraser Aitcheson as Guard
| 7 | 7 | "Let's Get the Big Bad!" | Zach Lipovsky | Anupam Nigam | April 18, 2017 | 108 | 0.15 |
Guest stars: Ali Liebert as Principal Grey, Peter Benson as Harper
| 8 | 8 | "Let's Deal with Our Stuff!" | Eric Dean Seaton | Steve Marmel | April 19, 2017 | 109 | 0.18 |
Guest stars: Peter Benson as Harper, Crystal Balint as Grace, Alyssa Lynch as Cassie, Rohan Campbell as Dane
| 9 | 9 | "Let's Get Some Answers!" | Zach Lipovsky | Erik Trueheart & Sib Ventress | April 20, 2017 | 110 | 0.19 |
Guest stars: Peter Benson as Harper, Ryan Beil as Leo
| 10 | 10 | "Let's Go Clubbing!" | Emile Levisetti | Teleplay by : Steve Marmel; Story by : Erik Trueheart & Sib Ventress and Steve Marmel | April 24, 2017 | 114 | 0.11 |
Guest stars: Alyssa Jirrels as Veracity, Alyssa Lynch as Cassie, Rohan Campbell as Dane
| 11 | 11 | "Let's Get Leo!" | Adam Stein | Lisa Muse Bryant | April 25, 2017 | 111 | 0.17 |
Guest stars: Ryan Beil as Leo, Peter Benson as Harper
| 12 | 12 | "Let's Dig Deep!" | Adam Stein | George Strayton | April 26, 2017 | 112 | 0.19 |
Guest stars: Ali Liebert as Principal Grey, Peter Benson as Harper, Ryan Beil as Leo, Kazumi Evans as Jessica
| 13 | 13 | "Let's Destroy Some Ooze!" | Emile Levisetti | Brusta Brown & John Mitchell Todd | April 27, 2017 | 113 | 0.18 |
Guest stars: Peter Benson as Harper, Ryan Beil as Leo, Crystal Balint as Grace, Alyssa Lynch as Cassie, Bob Frazer as Godfrey, Paul Lazenby as Morris
| 14 | 14 | "Let's End This! Part One" | Zach Lipovsky | Anupam Nigam | May 1, 2017 | 115 | 0.17 |
Guest stars: Peter Benson as Harper, Ryan Beil as Leo, Crystal Balint as Grace, Paul Lazenby as Morris, Dean Redman as Major, Aliza Vellani as Soldier, Sean Tyson as Security Guard
| 15 | 15 | "Let's End This! Part Two" | Zach Lipovsky | Steve Marmel | May 1, 2017 | 116 | 0.16 |
Guest stars: Peter Benson as Harper, Crystal Balint as Grace, Ryan Beil as Leo, Alyssa Lynch as Cassie, Paul Lazenby as Morris, Dean Redman as Major, Aliza Vellani as Soldier

=== Season 2 (2017–18) ===
| No. overall | No. in season | Title | Directed by | Written by | Original release date | Prod. code | U.S. viewers (millions) |
|---|---|---|---|---|---|---|---|
| 16 | 1 | "Versus the New Evil" | Zach Lipovsky | Steve Marmel & Anupam Nigam | September 9, 2017 | 201 | N/A |
Guest stars: Ali Liebert as Mysterious Figure/Grey, Bob Frazer as Godfrey, Michael P. Northey as Principal Dent, Rohan Campbell as Dane
| 17 | 2 | "Versus the Deep" | Zach Lipovsky | George Strayton | September 9, 2017 | 202 | N/A |
Guest stars: Ryan Beil as Leo, Ali Liebert as Mysterious Figure/Grey, Peter Benson as Seth Harper, Crystal Balint as Grace Walker Absent: Alyssa Jirrels as Veracity
| 18 | 3 | "Versus the Outbreak" | Eric Dean Seaton | Steve Marmel & Anupam Nigam | September 9, 2017 | 203 | N/A |
Guest stars: Ali Liebert as Grey, Peter Benson as Seth Harper, Paul Lazenby as Morris, Michael P. Northey as Principal Dent
| 19 | 4 | "Versus Harper's Ghost" | Eric Dean Seaton | Steve Marmel & Anupam Nigam | September 9, 2017 | 204 | N/A |
Guest stars: Ryan Beil as Leo, Ali Liebert as Grey, Peter Benson as Seth Harper
| 20 | 5 | "Versus the Mountain" | Jem Garrard | Sib Ventress | September 9, 2017 | 205 | N/A |
Guest stars: Crystal Balint as Grace Walker, Ryan Beil as Leo Absent: Alyssa Jirrels as Veracity
| 21 | 6 | "Versus the Dark Night" | Jem Garrard | Kyle Mack | November 4, 2017 | 206 | N/A |
Guest stars: Ryan Beil as Leo, Dan Payne as Traeger, Ali Liebert as Grey
| 22 | 7 | "Versus the Tech Army" | Zach Lipovsky | Amy-Jo Perry | November 4, 2017 | 207 | N/A |
Guest stars: Dan Payne as Traeger, Ali Liebert as Grey, Peter Benson as Seth Harper, Crystal Balint as Grace Walker
| 23 | 8 | "Versus Traeger" | Zach Lipovsky | Steve Marmel | November 4, 2017 | 208 | N/A |
Guest stars: Dan Payne as Traeger, Ryan Beil as Leo, Dean Marshall as Randall
| 24 | 9 | "Versus Velocity and Veracity" | Adam Stein | Anupam Nigam | November 4, 2017 | 209 | N/A |
Guest stars: Dan Payne as Traeger, Ali Liebert as Grey
| 25 | 10 | "Versus the Arctic" | Adam Stein | Steve Marmel & Anupam Nigam | November 4, 2017 | 210 | N/A |
Guest stars: Dan Payne as Traeger, Ali Liebert as Grey, Crystal Balint as Grace Walker
| 26 | 11 | "Versus the Wolves at the Door" | Eric Dean Seaton | Kyle Mack | March 25, 2018 | TBA | 0.21 |
Guest stars: Ryan Beil as Leo, Dan Payne as Traeger, Peter Benson as Seth Harper, Dean Marshall as Randall
| 27 | 12 | "Versus the Thirty" | Eric Dean Seaton | Brusta Brown & John Mitchell Todd | April 1, 2018 | TBA | 0.17 |
Guest stars: Ryan Beil as Leo, Ali Liebert as Grey, Peter Benson as Seth Harper, Dean Marshall as Randall
| 28 | 13 | "Versus Miami" | Zach Lipovsky | Eric Trueheart | April 8, 2018 | TBA | 0.20 |
Guest stars: Ryan Beil as Leo, Dan Payne as Traeger, Ali Liebert as Grey, Peter Benson as Seth Harper, Crystal Balint as Grace Walker
| 29 | 14 | "Versus the X-Weapon" | Zach Lipovsky | George Strayton | April 15, 2018 | TBA | 0.19 |
Guest stars: Ryan Beil as Leo, Dan Payne as Traeger, Peter Benson as Seth Harper, Crystal Balint as Grace Walker
| 30 | 15 | "Versus Sabotage" | Adam Stein | Leah Folta & Mary Iacono | April 22, 2018 | TBA | 0.12 |
Guest stars: Ryan Beil as Leo, Dan Payne as Traeger Absent: Alyssa Jirrels as Veracity
| 31 | 16 | "Versus the Monster Within" | Adam Stein | Steve Marmel & Anupam Nigam | July 23, 2018 | TBA | 0.17 |
Guest stars: Dan Payne as Traeger, Ali Liebert as Grey, Peter Benson as Seth Harper, Paul Lazenby as Morris, Michael P. Northey as Principal Dent, Rohan Campbell as Dane
| 32 | 17 | "Versus the Betrayal" | Jem Garrard | Kyle Mack | July 30, 2018 | TBA | 0.12 |
Guest stars: Dan Payne as Traeger, Peter Benson as Seth Harper, Crystal Balint as Grace Walker, Paul Lazenby as Morris
| 33 | 18 | "Versus Harris" | Jem Garrard | George Strayton | August 6, 2018 | TBA | 0.06 |
Guest stars: Dan Payne as Traeger, Peter Benson as Seth Harper, Crystal Balint as Grace Walker, Paul Lazenby as Morris, Rohan Campbell as Dane
| 34 | 19 | "Versus the Infected" | Nimisha Mukerji | Amy-Jo Perry | August 13, 2018 | TBA | 0.16 |
Guest stars: Crystal Balint as Grace Walker, Rohan Campbell as Dane
| 35 | 20 | "Versus the End" | Zach Lipovsky | Anupam Nigam and Steve Marmel | August 20, 2018 | TBA | 0.10 |
Guest stars: Dan Payne as Traeger, Peter Benson as Seth Harper, Crystal Balint as Grace Walker

== Ratings ==
Viewership and ratings per season of Mech-X4
| Season | Episodes | First aired | | Last aired | | Avg. viewers (millions) |
| Season | Episodes | Date | Viewers (millions) | Date | Viewers (millions) | Avg. viewers (millions) |
|---|---|---|---|---|---|---|
| 1 | 15 | November 11, 2016 | 1.26 | May 1, 2017 | 0.16 | 0.48 |
| 2 | 10 | September 9, 2017 | TBD | August 20, 2018 | 0.10 | 0.15 |
