= Campus Code =

- Film poster
- Directed by: Cathy Scorsese; Kenneth M. Waddell
- Written by: Michael Simon; Kenneth M. Waddell
- Produced by: Cathy Scorsese; Michael Simon; Kenneth M. Waddell
- Starring: Jack Falahee; Hannah Hodson; Alice Kremelberg; Conor Leslie; Jesse McCartney; Ritesh Rajan; Ray Liotta; Martin Scorsese
- Cinematography: Peter Fernberger
- Edited by: Kenneth M. Waddell
- Production company: Campus Life Productions
- Distributed by: JumpView Entertainment
- Release date: September 22, 2015
- Running time: 110 minutes
- Country: United States
- Language: English

Campus Code is a 2015 American science fiction-action film directed by Cathy Scorsese and Kenneth M. Waddell and written by Waddell and Michael Simon. It stars Jack Falahee, Hannah Hodson, Alice Kremelberg, Conor Leslie, Jesse McCartney, and Ritesh Rajan as students on a college campus where strange occurrences begin to take place. Scorsese's father Martin and his collaborator Ray Liotta also make cameo appearances in the film.

Originally entitled Campus Life, the film was created as original content for the website JumpView in 2013, where the storylines of individual characters would be viewed separately or switched between manually. The footage was later re-edited into a conventional film, which became Campus Code. To date, it is JumpView's only original film.

== Plot ==
College student Becca begins to notice strange events on her campus, which become more apparent when she sees classmate Ari fall from a great height and appear unharmed. The two attempt to uncover the secrets of their campus while being antagonized by Elliot, the student who caused Ari to fall. Meanwhile, Ari's friend Arun and his girlfriend Izzy are blackmailed by the Griefers, a group of students who want complete free will on the campus. Arun confides in Greta, a new student he meets, about his parents forcing him into an arranged marriage and he has locked them in his closet.

During a party, Elliot abruptly disintegrates and an earthquake appears to affect the campus. Only Becca, Ari, Arun, and Izzy appear to witness these events and find themselves being hunted by the campus' security guards. Izzy now claims she cannot remember why she was being blackmailed and the Griefers are disintegrated before they can reveal her secret. Greta helps the guards capture Izzy, but is also disintegrated for letting Arun escape. Ari, Becca, and Arun attempt to leave the campus through its exit, only to end up back at the entrance, while a strange entity in the sky attempts to kill them. They manage to evade the entity and reunite with Izzy as they look for a place to hide.

It is revealed the events on the campus have been taking place inside a video game and the students are avatars controlled by players. Arun is a young Indian man who resents being forced into an arranged marriage, Greta is the young Indian woman arranged to marry Arun and was playing the game to meet him, Izzy is a closeted trans woman, and Ari's player has been using the game to generate income. Ari, Arun, and Izzy, however, all escaped from their players' control and gained sentience, while Becca is implied to be a virus who escaped quarantine and inadvertently infected the other three. Responsible for the attempts on their lives are the game's programmers to prevent them from infecting other avatars.

Upon realizing the truth, Arun, Izzy, Ari, and Becca question what their next move should be. After some deliberation, Becca states they will contact their creators.

== Cast ==
- Jesse McCartney as Ari
  - David Meyers as real-life Ari
- Hannah Hodson as Becca
- Ritesh Rajan as Arun
  - Shivantha Wijesinha as real-life Arun
- Alice Kremelberg as Izzy
  - Chris Dwan as real-life Izzy
- Conor Leslie as Greta
  - Shikha Jaim as real-life Greta / Prana
- Jack Falahee as Elliot
- Chris Cafero as Griefer leader
- Jessica Alexandra Green as Jennifer
- Ray Liotta as the bartender
- Martin Scorsese as the doctor

== Production ==
Campus Code was created as original content for the website JumpView, which edits the footage of films and television series to allow viewers to switch between the perspectives of different characters or watch them entirely from the perspective of one character. The film was conceived by JumpView founders Michael Simon and Kenneth M. Waddell to help launch the website, with both serving as co-writers and co-producers and Waddell editing and co-directing. Cathy Scorsese, a friend of Waddell's from attending the New York University Tisch School of the Arts together, joined as a co-producer and co-director. Scorsese was responsible for the cameo appearances from her father Martin and his Goodfellas collaborator Ray Liotta.

First released under the title Campus Life in 2013, viewers would watch the storylines of Ari, Becca, Arun, Izzy, and Greta separately, with the option of switching to another storyline at any time, and at least two storylines had to be viewed in their entirety to see the film's ending. Campus Code is a re-edit of the original release's footage, turning it into a conventional film.

Filming took place at the Florham Park campus of Fairleigh Dickinson University in Madison, New Jersey.

== Lawsuits ==
In 2013, co-director Cathy Scorsese filed legal action against JumpView Entertainment, alleging she was fraudulently promised 25 percent of the company's profits in an oral agreement. JumpView co-founders Michael Simon and Kenneth M. Waddell filed a lawsuit against Scorsese the same year for alleged conversion, commercial disparagement, tortious interference, breach of contract, and defamation and demanded at least $350,000 in damages. Through their lawsuit, Simon and Waddell alleged Scorsese reneged on promises she made during the production, demonstrated erratic behavior throughout filming, and prevented the film from being promoted. Both lawsuits were dismissed in 2014; the lawsuit against Scorsese was settled out of court and the lawsuit against JumpView Entertainment was voluntarily dismissed.
