= List of Hawthorne episodes =

The following is a list of episodes of the TNT medical drama Hawthorne. The series stars Jada Pinkett Smith as Christina Hawthorne, Chief Nursing Officer, and Michael Vartan as Tom Wakefield, Chief of Surgery at Richmond Trinity Hospital in Richmond, Virginia. In season 2, a new star came on the scene, Marc Anthony as Detective Nick Renata, and the cast moved from Richmond Trinity Hospital to James River Hospital, also in Richmond, Virginia. Hawthorne premiered on June 16, 2009.

A total of 30 episodes of Hawthorne were produced over three seasons, between June 16, 2009 and August 16, 2011.

== Series overview ==
Season	Episodes	Originally released	
Season	Episodes	First released	Last released
1	10	June 16, 2009	August 18, 2009
2	10	June 22, 2010	August 24, 2010
3	10	June 14, 2011	August 16, 2011

== Episodes ==
=== Season 1 (2009) ===
No. overall	No. in season	Title	Directed by	Written by	Original release date	U.S. viewers (millions)
1	1	"Pilot"	Mikael Salomon	John Masius	June 16, 2009	3.82
2	2	"Healing Time"	Arvin Brown	John Masius	June 23, 2009	3.76
3	3	"Yielding"	Jeff Bleckner	Sarah Thorp	June 30, 2009	N/A
4	4	"All the Wrong Places"	Andy Wolk	Glen Mazzara	July 7, 2009	2.63
5	5	"The Sense of Belonging"	Mike Robe	Anna C. Miller	July 14, 2009	3.20
6	6	"Trust Me"	Ed Bianchi	Jeff Rake	July 21, 2009	3.21
7	7	"Night Moves"	Roxann Dawson	Bill Chais	July 28, 2009	3.61
8	8	"No Guts, No Glory"	Andy Wolk	Laurie Arent	August 4, 2009	3.58
9	9	"Mother's Day"	Jeff Bleckner	Glen Mazzara	August 11, 2009	3.35
10	10	"Hello and Goodbye"	Jeff Bleckner	Sarah Thorp & Anna C. Miller	August 18, 2009	3.52

=== Season 2 (2010) ===
No. overall	No. in season	Title	Directed by	Written by	Original release date	U.S. viewers (millions)
11	1	"No Excuses"	Jeff Bleckner	Glen Mazzara	June 22, 2010	3.42
12	2	"The Starting Line"	Ed Bianchi	John Masius & Erica Shelton	June 29, 2010	2.95
13	3	"Road Narrows"	Ed Bianchi	Sang Kyu Kim	July 6, 2010	2.73
14	4	"Afterglow"	Jeff Bleckner	Darin Goldberg & Shelley Meals	July 13, 2010	2.64
15	5	"The Match"	Mike Robe	Adam E. Fierro & Glen Mazzara	July 20, 2010	2.86
16	6	"Final Curtain"	Tricia Brock	Sarah Thorp	July 27, 2010	2.63
17	7	"Hidden Truths"	Jeff Bleckner	Darin Goldberg & Shelley Meals	August 3, 2010	3.12
18	8	"A Mother Knows"	Tricia Brock	Erica Shelton	August 10, 2010	3.24
19	9	"Picture Perfect"	Jeff Bleckner	Adam E. Fierro & Lisa Randolph	August 17, 2010	3.79
20	10	"No Exit"	Jeff Bleckner	Story by : Adam E. Fierro & Glen Mazzara; Teleplay by : Glen Mazzara	August 24, 2010	3.48

=== Season 3 (2011) ===
No. overall	No. in season	Title	Directed by	Written by	Original release date	U.S. viewers (millions)
21	1	"For Better or Worse"	Peter Werner	John Tinker	June 14, 2011	2.58
22	2	"Fight or Flight"	Seith Mann	Sang Kyu Kim	June 21, 2011	2.21
23	3	"Parental Guidance Required"	Mike Robe	Allison Robbins & John Romano	June 28, 2011	2.42
24	4	"A Fair to Remember"	Stephen Gyllenhaal	Darin Goldberg & Shelley Meals	July 5, 2011	2.52
25	5	"Let Freedom Sing"	Adam Kane	Sibyl Gardner	July 12, 2011	2.42
26	6	"Just Between Friends"	Rosemary Rodriguez	Allison Robbins & John Romano	July 19, 2011	2.25
27	7	"To Tell the Truth"	Tony Goldwyn	Allison Robbins & Sibyl Gardner	July 26, 2011	2.19
28	8	"Price of Admission"	Rosemary Rodriguez	John Tinker	August 2, 2011	2.46
29	9	"Signed, Sealed, Delivered"	Rosemary Rodriguez	John Romano	August 9, 2011	2.35
30	10	"A Shot in the Dark"	Michael Schultz	Darin Goldberg & Shelley Meals	August 16, 2011	2.87
