= Final Days of Planet Earth =

- Television film poster
- Genre: Science-Fiction, Horror
- Written by: Roger Soffer
- Directed by: Robert Lieberman
- Starring: Campbell Scott; Gil Bellows; Daryl Hannah
- Music by: Jeff Rona
- Country of origin: United States
- Original language: English
- No. of episodes: 2

Production
- Producer: Micael O'Connor
- Cinematography: Thomas Burstyn
- Editor: Michael John Bateman
- Running time: 170 minutes
- Production company: RHI Entertainment
- Budget: $12 million (estimated)

Original release
- Network: Hallmark Channel
- Release: October 6, 2006

Final Days of Planet Earth is a 2006 science fiction miniseries directed by Robert Lieberman and written by Roger Soffer. Starring Campbell Scott, Gil Bellows, and Daryl Hannah, the movie was produced by RHI Entertainment for the Hallmark Channel.

== Plot ==
Three years prior to the start of the series, a team of astronaut miners complete a space expedition. By the time they return to Earth, their commander has gone insane, taking an important secret with him to a heavily guarded state lunatic asylum.

At the beginning of the series, archaeologist Lloyd Walker and entomologist Marianne Winters are questioning a possible link between the space mission, the commander’s insanity, and a series of sudden, unexplained accidents and disappearances.

Liz Quinlan, an employee of the mayor’s office, is secretly the ruler of a species of aliens and knows their secret. Meanwhile, police and government officials are overwhelmed by these aliens who are masquerading as humans. Lloyd and Marianne search to find William Phillips, the commander and sole survivor of the mission, and the only person who knows the ultimate goal of the aliens and who can defeat them.

== Cast ==
- Daryl Hannah as Liz Quinlan
- Campbell Scott as William Phillips
- Gil Bellows as Lloyd Walker
- Sue Mathew as Marianne
- Patrick Gilmore as Spence
- Serge Houde as Korshaft
- Tygh Runyan as Nick
- Tina Milo Milivojevic as Bella
- William MacDonald as Cruikshank
- John Cassini as Jake Roth
- Michael Kopsa as Dalton

== Reception ==
=== Critical response ===
MORIA REVIEWS called the series "an absurd series on every level".
