= Red Widow =

American TV series

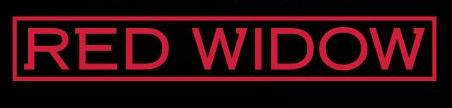
- Genre: Drama
- Created by: Melissa Rosenberg
- Based on: Penoza by Pieter Bart Korthuis
- Starring: Radha Mitchell; Goran Visnjic; Clifton Collins Jr.; Luke Goss; Jaime Ray Newman; Rade Šerbedžija; Lee Tergesen; Erin Moriarty; Sterling Beaumon; Jakob Salvati; Suleka Mathew; Wil Traval; Pedro Pascal
- Composer: Dave Porter
- Country of origin: United States
- Original language: English
- No. of seasons: 1
- No. of episodes: 8

Production
- Executive producers: Melissa Rosenberg; Alon Aranya; Howard Klein
- Producer: Tim Iacofano
- Production locations: Vancouver, British Columbia, Canada
- Running time: 60 minutes
- Production companies: ABC Studios; Endemol; Tall Girls Productions

Original release
- Network: ABC
- Release: March 3 – May 5, 2013

Red Widow is an American drama television series created by Melissa Rosenberg, starring Radha Mitchell and Goran Visnjic. On May 11, 2012, ABC picked up Red Widow as a series. The series ran from March 3 to May 5, 2013 and aired on Sundays. The series is based on a 2010 Dutch drama series titled Penoza created by Pieter Bart Korthuis and Diederik van Rooijen.

On May 10, 2013, ABC canceled the series after one season.

== Overview ==
The series stars Radha Mitchell as Marta Walraven, a housewife from Northern California whose husband, a marijuana smuggler, was killed. She has to continue his work to protect her family.

== Cast and characters ==
- Radha Mitchell as Marta Walraven (née Petrova), housewife and widow of Evan Walraven, a marijuana smuggler
- Goran Visnjic as Nicholae Schiller, San Francisco's premier crime boss and the man to whom Marta owes money
- Clifton Collins Jr. as James Ramos, the FBI agent assigned to Marta's case
- Rade Šerbedžija as Andrei Petrov, Marta's father, an organized crime boss in the Richmond and a rival of Schiller
- Luke Goss as Luther, one of Andrei's trusted men
- Jaime Ray Newman as Katrina "Kat" Petrova, Marta's and Irwin's sister
- Wil Traval as Irwin Petrov, Marta and Kat's brother, and business partner to Mike and Evan, and now Marta
- Lee Tergesen as Mike Tomlin, business partner to Irwin and Evan, and now Marta
- Sterling Beaumon as Gabriel Walraven, Marta's older son
- Jakob Salvati as Boris "Bobo" Walraven, Marta's younger son
- Erin Moriarty as Natalie Walraven, Marta's daughter and middle child
- Suleka Mathew as Dina Tomlin, Mike's wife and Marta's long-time best friend
- Pedro Pascal as Jay Castillo, Katrina's husband, a tattoo artist

== Episodes ==
No.	Title	Directed by	Written by	Original release date	US viewers (millions)
1	"Pilot"	Mark Pellington	Melissa Rosenberg	March 3, 2013	7.13
Marta Walraven finds her life in tatters after her husband is brutally murdered when she convinces him to get out of the mob. After finding that something was going on with her husband and her brother, she sees that she is now the one working for the mob, as he owed a debt to someone. After the police begin searching for a flash drive, Marta hides it, only to find that she can't enter it; Her son Gabriel then shows that he can access the files, making her realize that they didn't hide the data very well. On the flash drive, they find that her husband was planning on turning in all of her family to the police, after which Marta and their children would enter the Witness Protection Program. When Marta attempts to pay Nicholae Schiller, the man her husband owed money to, she finds that the only way to protect her family and get her brother out of jail is to join the mob and import what they want her to.
2	"The Contact"	Dan Sackheim	Melissa Rosenberg	March 3, 2013	7.13
Two weeks after Evan's death, Marta begins questioning when Schiller is going to actually contact her; Michael also begins teaching Marta the basics about how her life is going to be now. While Natalie begins questioning what really happened to her father when she hears other people at school talking about him. Michael and Marta begin looking for a new supervisor, Bob, when they find that their original supervisor wanted to charge them more money; Marta gets distraught when she finds that Schiller put in a good word for Boris at a school, after he brought a gun to school and got expelled; Detective Ramos begins wondering what Marta is up to when he finds photos of Marta going into Schiller's building. Michael and Marta steal Bob's bike as collateral to get them to be their supervisor; while Marta begins to see that Gabriel is starting to help her when it comes to getting away from the cops. Marta gets worried when Bob gets scared off after she questions him about the shipment, but when she goes to him later he agrees that he can help her.
3	"The Consignment"	Terry McDonough	Elizabeth Benjamin	March 10, 2013	5.31
Marta gets her first assignment from Schiller—retrieve a shipment from a large container at the docks. First, she must take care of things at home as her concerned daughter Natalie goes to the FBI. Marta tries to calm her down, rather than be furious with her. At the docks, Marta successfully gets the job done but sees Schiller's men shoot Bob. She eventually realizes that Schiller was planning to kill her and ponders running away. Her son Boris recalls seeing a yellow stripe on the boot of the man that killed his father.
4	"The Escape"	Billy Gierhart	Jameal Turner	March 17, 2013	4.36
To escape Schiller's control, Marta decides to leave the country. Her plans however, are derailed by the release of Irwin. Fresh from jail Irwin picks back up where he left off with the drug ring. Complications arise though when his supplier, Orson, refuses to deal with him. Desperate to build up the business he reaches to his father, who turns him down. This quickly makes him turn to Schiller, who he hopes will find value of him like Marta. Much to his sister's horror, Irwin makes a deal with Schiller to supply the drugs if he will distribute. Placed in charge, Marta struggles to fix the problems before staging her escape to keep Schiller from coming after her. Irwin takes a money desperate Mike with him to force Orson's cooperation, but all goes wrong when one of Orson's men is shot and on the verge of dying. Marta takes the matter in hand and confronts Orson one on one. After punching Marta in the stomach for punishment, Orson decides to deal with her. Meanwhile Andrei has decided to confront Schiller about the situation when he learns that Marta is about to flee with the children. Andrei accuses him of targeting Marta to get at him as Schiller offers him a way out for Marta. If Andrei gives him the rest of his territory, he'd leave Marta be. Andrei refuses as he tells Marta the next day that he simply couldn't reason with Schiller and that she was on her own. Faced with a choice Marta tells Ramos that she'll get evidence to help put away Schiller.
5	"The Recorder"	Romeo Tirone	Dana Baratta	March 24, 2013	4.55
Marta helps the FBI spy on Schiller as he deals with a Russian woman from the Duchenko family to smuggle drugs. Natalie catches Kat kissing James. Marta finds Schiller's stolen cocaine sunken under the boat. Bobo remembers the assassin who killed his father was wearing black shoes with a yellow stripe.
6	"The Captive"	Rosemary Rodriguez	Ryan Farley	March 31, 2013	4.08
Marta consults with family on what to do about the cocaine. Natalie gets kidnapped by Mike and held ransom and Marta works with her father and Schiller to find her. Irwin steals the cocaine for himself, partners with one of Schiller's men, and sleeps with his father's girlfriend.
7	"The Coke"	J. Miller Tobin	Micah Schraft	April 28, 2013	3.47
Marta finds out Irwin stole the cocaine from her and intercepts his sale. Marta shoots Irwin in the hand and disavows him after finding out his true role in the death of her husband. Kat continues her affair with James. Marta throws the cocaine in the water. Schiller's man, betrayed by Irwin, attempts to kill him but kills Irwin's girlfriend. Irwin runs him over and Martha sees he's wearing the shoes the assassin wore.
8	"The Hit"	Alex Zakrzewski	Chris Black	May 5, 2013	3.41
Marta sets out to kill Schiller, as do her elder children, separately, but finds out Luther is the assassin of her husband under the order of her father. Marta and Irwin conspire with the FBI to get her father arrested and Luther dies saving Marta. Schiller kills Duchenko. Natalie, still under the impression that Schiller ordered her father's hit, confronts him with a gun.

== Reception ==
The show received mixed to negative reviews from critics. On the review aggregator website Rotten Tomatoes reported a 24% approval rating, based on 34 reviews, with an average rating of 4.6/10. The website's consensus reads, "Red Widow boasts a strong cast, but its outlandish premise and lackluster execution keep it from being anything but middle-of-the-road." Metacritic assigned the show a score of 48 out of 100 based on 24 critics, indicating "mixed or average reviews".

Mary McNamara, the Los Angeles Times television critic, called the show's two-hour pilot "high-aspiring but poorly executed"; according to McNamara:

Working from the original Dutch series Penoza, Red Widow is plagued by sanctimony. It wants to have it all: a sympathetic soccer mom heroine suddenly willing and able to do business with murderous thugs....It's easy to see the sort of show [creator Melissa] Rosenberg envisioned, one in which a "normal" woman finds herself juggling the mundane tasks of motherhood with the high-octane exploits required to keep one step in front of a drug lord. But the show is too busy hedging its bets—hey, he was just running pot, not the hard stuff, and she feels sort of guilty about dragging him into it—that it undercuts its own potential power.

== DVD releases ==
Red Widow - The Complete 1st Season was released onto DVD on May 28, 2013 in Region 1.
