= Alyssa Jirrels =

American actress

- Born: August 13, 2001 (age 25); Sebastopol, California, United States
- Occupation: Actress
- Years active: 2015–present

Alyssa Jirrels (born August 13, 2001) is an American actress. She is best known for playing Ellen Gallagher in the thriller series Fatal Attraction and Moira Mayfair in the thriller series Mayfair Witches.

== Early life ==
Jirrels was born in Sebastopol, California to Pam Koppel and Skip Jirrels. She became interested in acting at the age of 5 when she saw her mother perform. One of her earliest performances on stage was in Rumpelstiltskin. She moved to Los Angeles with her mother to further her acting career.

== Career ==
Early on in her career Jirrels made appearances in the The Good Doctor and Agents of S.H.I.E.L.D. She had a recurring role playing Yasmin in the reboot series Saved by the Bell Her first big role came playing Alyssa in the supernatural comedy series Boo, Bitch. Her biggest role so far has been playing Ellen Gallagher in the thriller series Fatal Attraction starring Joshua Jackson and Lizzy Caplan She starred in the thriller series Mayfair Witches alongside Alexandra Daddario where she portrayed Moira Mayfair.

== Personal life ==
During her childhood, she developed an interest in classic rock music, particularly the works of Led Zeppelin, Jimi Hendrix and Black Sabbath. Her favourite actress is Brie Larson, and her favourite film is He's Just Not That into You.

== Filmography ==
=== Film ===
Year	Title	Role	Notes
2015	The Art of Escape	Charlotte Johnson	
2020	This Is the Year	Zoey	
2020	Under the Lights	Molly	Short
2021	Frank	Lucy	

=== Television ===
Year	Title	Role	Notes
2016	Girl Meets World	Chai	Episode; Girl Meets She Don't Like Me
2017	Very Bad Nanny	Kelly Buckley	Episode; The Divorce
2018	Alexa & Katie	Vanessa	4 episodes
2018	Agents of S.H.I.E.L.D.	Young Hale	Episode; Rise and Shine
2017–2018	Mech-X4	Veracity Campbell	21 episodes
2019	Commit 2 the Bit	PA	Episode; 4th Sketch-Aversary
2020	The Good Doctor	Angie	Episode; Mutations
2020	Schooled	Dawn	Episode; Clueless
2020	Acting for a Cause	Narrator	Episode; A Midsummer Night's Dream
2021	NCIS: Los Angeles	Jocelyn	Episode; Done
2021	American Housewife	Audra	Episode; How Oliver Got His Groove Back
2020–2021	Saved by the Bell	Yasmin	5 episodes
2022	As We See It	Nicole Dietrich	5 episodes
2022	Boo, Bitch	Alyssa	5 episodes
2023	Fatal Attraction	Ellen Gallagher	8 episodes
2023	M.I.A	London	2 episodes
2025–present	Mayfair Witches	Moira Mayfair	8 episodes
