= Remember Sunday =

- Release poster
- Genre: Romance
- Screenplay by: Michael Kase; Barry Morrow
- Directed by: Jeff Bleckner
- Starring: Zachary Levi; Alexis Bledel
- Theme music composer: Christopher Lennertz
- Country of origin: United States
- Original language: English

Production
- Producer: Hallmark Hall of Fame Productions
- Cinematography: Michael Lohmann
- Editors: David Beatty; Michael N. Knue
- Running time: 96 minutes
- Production company: Hallmark Hall of Fame

Original release
- Network: ABC
- Release: April 21, 2013

Related
- The Makeover; Christmas in Conway

Remember Sunday is a 2013 American romantic drama film directed by Jeff Bleckner, written by Michael Kase and Barry Morrow, and starring Zachary Levi and Alexis Bledel.

== Plot ==
The story follows Molly (Bledel), a struggling waitress, and Gus (Levi), a jewelry store employee. Gus and Molly meet through a chance encounter when Gus is at Molly's diner waiting for his best friend. Molly sees Gus reciting notes into his pen recorder and when he goes to take a phone call she leaves a message on it for him. Soon after, Molly and Gus begin to date. Molly does not yet realize it, but Gus is unable to make new memories due to having had a brain aneurysm years before. As a result, he forgets the day's events every time he goes to sleep.

Molly soon finds out that he has been recording all of their conversations on his pen. Gus tries to explain, but Molly mistakenly assumes it is for nefarious purposes. A few weeks later Molly returns to the apartment and meets Gus's sister Lucy who explains everything and gives Molly the file folder Gus had filled with mementos and notes of his time with Molly. Lucy also explains that Gus was a gifted scientist on the verge of a major discovery about the universe when he had the aneurysm.

Molly visits the hospital where Gus is under observation and introduces herself as his girlfriend. She shows him the folder so he can learn more about their relationship, along with a brochure for a surgery that may potentially fix his brain. Molly takes Gus to his old job at Mt. Wilson telescope in southern California, where he visits with his former colleagues. Molly also meets Gus's ex-fiancée, one of his former co-workers, who explains why things had ended between them and warns her of the difficulties that any sort of serious relationship will have.

Afterward, Gus asks Molly to leave him if the operation to fix his brain damage does not work. When they return, Gus's sister tells Molly that Gus had this very operation two years prior, but it did not work. That night Molly sees a note on Gus's laptop to ask her to marry him the next day. Molly deletes the note, and the reminders of her, after reflecting on what Gus asked her to do.

Gus wakes up the next day without any memory of her. Molly opens a flower shop, a lifelong dream, to move on with her life. One day while working at a wedding, a shooting star appears and Molly is reminded of Gus. She visits him at the jewelry shop the next day. He recognizes her name from an envelope he had kept containing an antique ring that had belonged to Molly's great aunt, something she sold to the store when she needed money. Gus had repaired the ring and kept it to return to Molly someday at no expense. He gives it back to her and she begins to cry tears of happiness and hints to him that they know each other. Gus agrees to go out for coffee at Molly's request.

== Cast ==
- Alexis Bledel - Molly
- Zachary Levi - Gus
- Merritt Wever - Lucy
- Barry Shabaka Henley - Baptiste
- Valerie Azlynn - Jolene
- David Hoffman - Jerry
- Jerry Adler - Sam
- Ann McKenzie - Ardis Applebaum
- Dana Gourrier - Bernadette
- Larisa Oleynik - Lauren
- James DuMont - Dr. Felton
- Griff Furst - Professor Lawrence
- Richard Topol - Mccray
- Chris Conner - Lazlo
- Billy Slaughter - Jim

== DVD release ==
The film originally aired on ABC on April 21, 2013 and was available to order from Hallmark soon after.

== See also ==
- Anterograde amnesia
