= Dyin' on a Prayer =

- Grimm episode
- Episode no.: Season 4 Episode 4
- Directed by: Tawnia McKiernan
- Written by: Sean Calder
- Cinematography by: Eliot Rockett
- Editing by: Chris Willingham
- Production code: 404
- Original air date: November 14, 2014
- Running time: 42 minutes

Guest appearances
- Jacqueline Toboni as Theresa "Trubel" Rubel; Louise Lombard as Elizabeth Lascelles; Brigid Brannagh as Sara Fisher; David Julian Hirsh as Ben Fisher; Jakob Salvati as David Fisher; David Ury as Hofmann

Episode chronology
← Previous "The Last Fight"	Next → "Cry Luison"
- Grimm season 4

"Dyin' on a Prayer" is the fourth episode of season 4 of the supernatural drama television series Grimm and the 70th episode overall, which premiered on November 14, 2014, on the cable network NBC. The episode was written by Sean Calder and was directed by Tawnia McKiernan.

== Plot ==
Opening quote: "Oh, remember that you fashioned me out of clay! Will you then bring me down to dust?"

Two masked men throw a brick through the spice shop window and flee. Elizabeth (Louise Lombard) picks it up and discovers a Wolfsangel, a trap that symbolizes disregard to inter-marriage between mixed Wesen, in this case Monroe (Silas Weir Mitchell) and Rosalee (Bree Turner). They decide to drop the issue as it can be solved easily.

In their house, Nick (David Giuntoli) and Juliette (Bitsie Tulloch) discover that Trubel (Jacqueline Toboni) is gone and took all her belongings. Meanwhile, Keith Harrow (Kevin T. Williams) attacks his wife Sara Fisher (Brigid Brannagh) and child David (Jakob Salvati) in their house, all while woging into a Siegbarste and they flee from him. Sara's brother, Ben (David Julian Hirsh), discovers her beaten. He goes to a synagogue and reads an ancient scroll with clay. Nick finds Trubel in the trailer and she tells him about Chavez and the kidnapping and they decide to see if Chavez ever contacts her again.

Later that day, Keith is killed by an enormous creature and his body is discovered to be covered in clay. Nick and Hank (Russell Hornsby) investigate the murder and the scene is interrupted by Keith's brother Nate (Don Alder), who claims Sara killed Keith. Nick and Hank go with Sara to the hospital to interrogate her while Trubel talks with David. They try to investigate in the trailer but the creature cannot be identified. They are later called by Ben, who confesses to killing Keith and to meet him in the synagogue.

Nick and Hank talk with Ben, who shows them that he freed a Golem using the scroll and the remains left by a rabbi and he only did so because he was destroying the family. Due to the exaggeration of the evidence, they don't arrest him but have the remains tested to know their connection to Keith's clay. Renard (Sasha Roiz) returns to the station since his shooting and Nick and Hank discover that the remains match the clay found. Ben takes Sara and David to their house, where he is attacked by Nate, who wants to know who killed Keith. Sara calls the police and Nate leaves the house.

In Vienna, Adalind (Claire Coffee) and Hofmann (David Ury) continue running upstairs when faces appear in the wall. The faces chant that they know where her baby is, causing her to cry, but the faces flood the stairs. Monroe discovers Adalind in the spice shop but Rosalee assures him that it's Elizabeth, who managed to shift her form with the new potion. Nate is killed by the Golem in the street who escapes when he sees Nick, Hank and Ben approaching. Nick also discovers that Ben asked for the Golem to protect David and the Golem will kill anyone who threatens him. Nick then has Ben go to find a scroll to stop it and they discover that they need to put a shem into the Golem's mouth to stop him.

They arrive at Sara's house, where Trubel is. Nick pretends to forcibly arrest David which causes the Golem to arrive but Ben is unable to put the shem in his mouth. After the Golem begins to engulf Trubel, David picks up a toy action figure which he dropped, and hits the Golem multiple times with it, causing him to disappear. That night, Nick, Juliette and Trubel are visited by Monroe, Rosalee and Elizabeth, who have managed to find an antidote. However, Elizabeth states that there's a missing ingredient and Juliette is it.

== Reception ==
=== Viewers ===
The episode was viewed by 5.01 million people, earning a 1.2/4 in the 18-49 rating demographics on the Nielson ratings scale, ranking second on its timeslot and fifth for the night in the 18-49 demographics, behind 20/20, Last Man Standing, Dateline NBC, and Shark Tank. This was a 2% increase in viewership from the previous episode, which was watched by 4.93 million viewers with a 1.3/4. This means that 1.2 percent of all households with televisions watched the episode, while 4 percent of all households watching television at that time watched it. With DVR factoring in, the episode had a 2.1 ratings share in the 18-49 demographics.

=== Critical reviews ===
"Dyin' on a Prayer" received positive reviews. Kathleen Wiedel from TV Fanatic, gave a 4.8 star rating out of 5, stating: "Let's start off by saying Elizabeth is awesome. Louise Lombard knocks it out of the park every time she appears on screen, and Grimm Season 4 Episode 4 is no different. This touched something deeply serious, a less-than-savory part of our history whose specters haunt us today. The Wesen who threw the brick were hiding behind masks, which brought to mind certain other hate-based, mask-wearing racist organizations."

MaryAnn Sleasman from TV.com, wrote, "TV audiences can be a demanding bunch. We want this and we want that and it better be done right, dammit or there will be certain hell to pay (on the internet, at least). When a show takes a wrong turn, the patience required to stick around and wait for it to re-route—if it does re-route—can be hard to find. So while Grimm has been lucky as of late in that its list of shortcomings has been, well, short, I was still surprised (and delighted) by how quickly the series rectified what few issues I've had with it in the recent past. I even kind of like Trubel these days."

Christine Horton of Den of Geek wrote, "After last week’s so-so episode, Grimm continues this fourth season at its own, leisurely pace with a few surprises thrown in here and there to stop us from throwing our TV dinners in the air in exasperation at the lack of action."
