= Twist of Faith (2013 film) =

2013 television film

- Promotional poster
- Screenplay by: Joyce Gittlin; Janet Fattal; Stephen Tolkin
- Story by: Joyce Gittlin; Janet Fattal
- Directed by: Paul A. Kaufman
- Starring: Toni Braxton; David Julian Hirsh; Nathaniel James Potvin; Paula Shaw; Kyra Zagorsky; Mykelti Williamson
- Composer: Jeff Toyne
- Country of origin: United States; Canada
- Original language: English

Production
- Executive producers: Andrew Howard; Jonathan Shore; Karyn Edwards; Paul A. Kaufman; Daniel H. Blatt; Craig Baumgarten; Shawn Williamson
- Producer: Jamie Goehring
- Cinematography: Kamal Derkaoui
- Editor: Garry M.B. Smith
- Running time: 85 minutes
- Production company: Lighthouse Pictures

Original release
- Network: Lifetime
- Release: February 9, 2013

Twist of Faith is a 2013 American-Canadian romantic drama television film directed by Paul A. Kaufman. The film centers on Nina (Toni Braxton), a single mother living in Brent, Alabama, who helps Jacob Fisher (David Julian Hirsh), an Orthodox Jewish man originally residing in Brooklyn whose wife and three children were murdered. Nina is assisted by her gospel community who helps Jacob make sense of his loss. The film premiered on Lifetime on February 9, 2013. Braxton's son who was diagnosed with autism played a minor role in the film.

== Cast ==
- Toni Braxton as Nina Jones
- David Julian Hirsh as Jacob Fisher
- Nathaniel James Potvin as Asher Jones
- Mykelti Williamson as Uncle Moe
- Paula Shaw as Hava Fisher
- Kyra Zagorsky as Ruth Fisher
