= David Julian Hirsh =

Canadian actor (b. 1973)

- Born: October 26, 1973 (age 51); Montreal, Quebec, Canada
- Occupations: Actor; screenwriter; producer
- Years active: 1998–present

David Julian Hirsh (born October 26, 1973) is a Canadian actor.

== Early life ==
Born and raised in a Jewish family in Montreal, and is descended from Holocaust survivors from Poland. Hirsh majored in criminology at the University of Toronto. He originally planned to become a lawyer until a summer acting workshop in New York convinced him to pursue an acting career. He studied acting at the Lee Strasberg Theatre and Film Institute in New York City.

== Career ==
Hirsh starred in the first two seasons of the TNT medical drama series Hawthorne, and in shows such as the Showcase comedy series Naked Josh, Lovebites on TBS, the CBC Television drama miniseries St. Urbain's Horseman and he portrayed Rabbi David Bloom on Weeds. Hirsh starred in the 2013 television film Twist of Faith, which garnered him a Canadian Screen Award nomination.

== Filmography ==
=== Film ===
Year	Title	Role	Notes
2001	Blue Hill Avenue	Lloyd	
2001	OHM	Jeremy	
2002	Confessions of a Dangerous Mind	Freddie Cannon	
2004	Noel	Barton	
2004	Camp Hollywood	—	Producer and writer
2005	Sombre Zombie	Jon Peter	Short film
2007	Urban Trenches	Travis White	Short film
2009	The Trotsky	Eli Bronstein	
2011	The Chicago 8	Tom Hayden	
2017	Sons of God	Eli	
2018	Swap	John	

=== Television ===
Year	Title	Role	Notes
1998	La Femme Nikita	Kronen	Episode: "New Regime"
2000	Twice in a Lifetime	Zeke	Episode: "Matchmaker, Matchmaker"
2001	Leap Years	Josh Adler	Main role
2001	Largo Winch	Danny Valance	Episode: "Legacy"
2002	Just Cause	Jason	Episode: "Bet Your Life"
2003	The Dead Zone	Thomas Berke	Episode: "The Outsider"
2003	Coast to Coast	Benjamin Pierce	Television film
2004–2006	Naked Josh	Josh Gould	Main role
2005	CSI: NY	Zack Shannon	3 episodes
2006–2007	Lovebites	Max	Main role
2007	St. Urbain's Horseman	Jake	Miniseries
2008	Cold Case	Kenneth Yates '91	Episode: "True Calling"
2009–2010	Hawthorne	Ray Stein	Main role (seasons 1–2)
2010	Ghost Whisperer	Brian	Episode: "Dead to Me"
2010	CSI: Crime Scene Investigation	Jason Jones	Episode: "Sqweegel"
2012	House of Lies	Aaron Matthews	Episode: "Business"
2012	Touch	Will Davies	Episode: "Lost and Found"
2012	Weeds	Rabbi David Bloom	7 episodes
2012	Flashpoint	Dr. Jason Alston	Episode: "No Kind of Life"
2013	The Surrogacy Trap	Mitch Bennet	Television film
2013	Twist of Faith	Jacob Fisher	Television film Nominated—Canadian Screen Award for Best Performance by an Actor in a Leading Role in a Dramatic Program or Mini-Series
2013	Motive	Eric Chase	Episode: "Detour"
2014	Grimm	Ben Fisher	Episode: "Dyin' on a Prayer"
2015	Stalker	Keith Bradshaw	Episode: "The News"
2016	Rosewood	Dr. Kipley Reed	Episode: "Atherosclerosis and the Alabama Flim-Flam"
2017	Love Locks	Trent Greer	Television film
2018	Taken	Clayton Bass	Episode: "S.E.R.E."
2021	Jupiter's Legacy	Dr. Richard Conrad / Blue Bolt	6 episodes
