= Jeff Bleckner =

American theatre, television, and film director

- Born: August 12, 1943 (age 83); Brooklyn, New York, U.S.
- Occupations: Theatre director; television director; film director

Jeff Bleckner (born August 12, 1943) is an American theatre, television, and film director.

== Biography ==
Born in Brooklyn, New York, Bleckner made his directorial debut off-Broadway with The Unseen Hand/Forensic and the Navigators, an evening of one-act plays by Sam Shepard, in 1970. He also directed three off-Broadway productions of works by David Rabe: the first two plays in his Vietnam War trilogy, The Basic Training of Pavlo Hummel and Sticks and Bones (both of which transferred to Broadway), and The Orphan. Additional Broadway credits include Paul Zindel's The Secret Affairs of Mildred Wild and Herb Gardner's The Goodbye People.

Bleckner's television directing credits include Welcome Back, Kotter, Bret Maverick, The Stockard Channing Show, Knots Landing, Dynasty, Trapper John, M.D., Lou Grant, Remington Steele, Hill Street Blues, Commander in Chief, Medium, Hawthorne Blackout Effect, NTSB The crash of flight 323 and Boston Legal, in addition to numerous television movies. His most recent project is the pilot for Conspiracy, a potential series for the 2007–08 season, starring Lisa Sheridan as a Washington, D.C. attorney attempting to undercover the secrets of a pharmaceutical company she successfully defended. He is also the director of Remember Sunday (2013), an American romantic drama film.

== Filmography ==
=== Films ===
Year	Title	Director	Producer
1974	A Sunday Dinner (Short Film)	Yes	Yes
1977	An Apple, An Orange	Yes	No
1980	Willow B: Women in Prison	Yes	No
1983	When Your Lover Leaves	Yes	No
1984	Things Are Looking Up	Yes	No
1985	Do You Remember Love	Yes	No
1985	Brotherly Love	Yes	No
1987	White Water Summer	Yes	No
1988	Terrorist on Trial: The United States vs. Salim Ajami	Yes	No
1988	My Father, My Son	Yes	No
1992	Last Wish	Yes	No
1992	In Sickness and in Health	Yes	No
1993	New Year	Yes	No
1994	A Father for Charlie	Yes	No
1995	Serving in Silence: The Margarethe Cammermeyer Story	Yes	No
1996	On Seventh Avenue	Yes	Yes
1997	The Advocate's Devil	Yes	Yes
1998	Blackout Effect	Yes	Yes
1998	Rear Window	Yes	Yes
2000	Runaway Virus	Yes	Yes
2000	Flowers for Algernon	Yes	Yes
2001	Black River	Yes	No
2003	The Music Man	Yes	Yes
2004	NTSB: The Crash of Flight 323	Yes	No
2004	Gramercy Park	Yes	No
2005	Have No Fear: The Life of Pope John Paul II	Yes	No
2008	The Russell Girl	Yes	No
2009	Loving Leah	Yes	No
2011	Beyond the Blackboard	Yes	No
2013	Remember Sunday	Yes	No
2015	Away and Back	Yes	No

== Awards and nominations ==
Awards

- 1971 Drama Desk Award Most Promising Director (The Basic Training of Pavlo Hummel)
- 1972 Drama Desk Award for Outstanding Director (Sticks and Bones)
- 1982 Emmy Award for Outstanding Directing in a Drama Series (Hill Street Blues)
- 1984 Emmy Award for Outstanding Directing in a Limited Series or a Special (Concealed Enemies)
- 1984 Directors Guild of America Award for Outstanding Directorial Achievement in a Dramatic Series (Hill Street Blues)
- 2001 Directors Guild of America Award for Outstanding Directorial Achievement in Movies for Television (The Beach Boys: An American Family)

Nominations

- 1972 Tony Award for Best Direction of a Play (Sticks and Bones)
- 1982 Emmy Award for Outstanding Directing in a Drama Series (Hill Street Blues)
- 1985 Emmy Award for Outstanding Directing in a Limited Series or a Special (Do You Remember Love)
- 1986 Directors Guild of America Award for Outstanding Directorial Achievement in Dramatic Specials (Do You Remember Love)
- 1995 Emmy Award for Outstanding Individual Achievement in Directing for a Miniseries or a Special (Serving in Silence: The Margarethe Cammermeyer Story)
- 2000 Emmy Award for Outstanding Miniseries (The Beach Boys: An American Family)
- 2001 Directors Guild of America Award for Outstanding Directorial Achievement in Movies for Television (The Beach Boys: An American Family)
- 2004 Directors Guild of America Award for Outstanding Directorial Achievement in Movies for Television (The Music Man)
- 2012 Directors Guild of America Award for Outstanding Directorial Achievement in Movies for Television/Mini-Series (Beyond the Blackboard, 2011)
