= Suleka Mathew =

Canadian actress

- Born: Kerala, India
- Occupation: Actress
- Years active: 1988–present

Suleka Mathew is a Canadian actress, best known for her lead roles on television series Claws (TNT) as Arlene Branch, Red Widow (ABC) as Dina Tomson, Men in Trees (ABC) as Sara Jackson, and Da Vinci's Inquest (CBC) as Dr. Sunita Raman for which she was nominated 3 times for best actress at the Leo Awards. Notable guest starring roles include The West Wing and Flashpoint. Her film roles include romantic comedies Touch of Pink which premiered at the Sundance Film Festival and the upcoming movie That's Amor (Netflix).

She was born in Kerala, India, raised in Vancouver, British Columbia and currently resides in Los Angeles, California.

In addition to film and television, Mathew has also done audio work, including narrating the Audie Award nominated book The Sad Truth About Happiness by Anne Giardini and The Management of Grief by Bharati Mukherjee. She was also a cast in Rohinton Mistry's A Fine Balance and Veronica Tennant's Shadow Pleasures inspired by Michael Ondaatje.

Her most recent theatre work includes starring as Phyllis in Annie Baker's Body Awareness for Mitch and Murray Productions.

Mathew has volunteered for non-profit organizations such as Habitat for Humanity, MPTF, and Performers for Literacy.

== Filmography ==
Film
Year	Title	Role	Notes
1991	Run	Casino Cashier	
1991	The Hitman	Attendant	
1995	Dangerous Indiscretion	Nancy Coles	
2000	Lift	Pride	Short film
2001	Lola	Coffee Shop Woman	
2002	Life or Something Like It	Airline Attendant	
2003	The Republic of Love	Yasmine	
2004	Touch of Pink	Nuru Jahan	
2005	The Score	Annette	
2005	Bear with Me	TV Reporter	
2018	Midnight Sun	Dr. Paula Fleming	
2020	That's Amor	Kerala	

Television
Year	Title	Role	Notes
1988	21 Jump Street	Valerie	Episode: "Whose Choice Is It Anyway?"
1989	MacGyver	Darlene	Episode: "The Challenge"; Episode: "Runners"
1989	21 Jump Street	Elena	Episode: "Loc'd Out: Part 1"
1990	Neon Rider	Jody Dixon	Episode: "The Mighty Quinn"
1990	Always Remember I Love You	Pam	TV movie
1993	The Commish	Sue	Episode: "Eastbridge Boulevard"
1994	The Commish	Assistant D.A.	Episode: "Working Girls"; Episode: "Born in the USA"
1994	The X-Files	Lisa Dole	Episode: "Roland"
1995	A Family Divided	Christine	TV movie
1995	Highlander: The Series	Vashti	Episode: "The Wrath of Kali"
1996	Have You Seen My Son	Reader	TV movie
1996	The X-Files	Agent Caleca	Episode: "Apocrypha"
1996	Profit		Episode: "Pilot"
1998	Viper	Sue Sanchez	Episode: "Trust No One"
1998	The Net	Technician	Episode: "Harvest"
1998–1999	The Crow: Stairway to Heaven	D.A. Cordelia Warren	7 episodes
1998–2003	Da Vinci's Inquest	Dr. Sunita 'Sunny' Ramen	66 episodes
2000	The Man Who Used to Be Me	Lt. Betsy Franklin	TV movie
2000	Secret Agent Man	Ellen	Episode: "The Breach"
2000	Dark Angel	News Reporter	Episode: "Pilot"; Episode: "C.R.E.A.M."
2001–2002	Stargate SG-1	Kali	Episode: "Summit" Episode: "Last Stand"
2002	The Eleventh Hour	Christine Mehta	Episode: "Mad as Hatters"
2003	A Crime of Passion	Det. Holloway	TV movie
2003	Battlestar Galactica	Reporter	TV miniseries
2003–2006	Stephen King's Dead Zone	Dr. Janet Gibson	6 episodes
2004	The West Wing	Ms. Chakrabarthi	Episode: "The Hubbert Peak"; Episode: "The Dover Test"
2006	Final Days of Planet Earth	Marianne	TV movie
2006–2008	Men in Trees	Sara Jackson	28 episodes
2009–2011	Hawthorne	Charge Nurse & Interim Chief Nursing Officer of James River Bobbie Jackson	30 episodes
2010	Stargate Universe	Constance	Episode: "Human"
2011	Good Morning, Killer	Barbara Sullivan	TV movie
2012	NCIS	Navy Commander Maria Castro	Episode: "The Missionary Position"
2012	Flashpoint	Dr. Bell (Psychologist)	Episode: "Fit for Duty"
2013	Red Widow	Dina Tomlin	Episode: "Pilot"
2014	Almost Human	Kay Stenson	Episode: "Disrupt"
2015	Castle	Detective Neely	Episode: "I, Witness"
2017–2019	Claws (TV series)	Arlene Branch	Main role
2020	Another Life	Callie	Episode: "Gift from the Gods"
2023	Mayfair Witches	Arjuna	4 episodes
