= Hawthorne (TV series) =

American medical drama television series (2009–2011)

- Also known as: HawthoRNe
- Genre: Medical drama
- Created by: John Masius
- Starring: Jada Pinkett Smith; Michael Vartan; David Julian Hirsh; Suleka Mathew; Christina Moore; Hannah Hodson; Vanessa Lengies; Marc Anthony; Adam Rayner
- Theme music composer: James Poyser; Julio Reyes Copello; Mauricio Gasca
- Composers: W. G. Snuffy Walden (season 1); The Angel (season 2); Julio Reyes Copello (season 3); The Graves Brothers (season 3)
- Country of origin: United States
- Original language: English
- No. of seasons: 3
- No. of episodes: 30 (list of episodes)

Production
- Executive producers: John Masius; Mikael Salomon (pilot only); Jamie Tarses; Jada Pinkett Smith; Glen Mazzara; John Tinker; Miguel Melendez
- Producers: Miguel Melendez; Preston Ficher; Sarah Thorp; Erica Shelton; Sang Kyu Kim; Allison Robbins
- Editors: Kaja Fehr; Monty DeGraff; Alam Baumgarten (pilot only); Elizabeth Kling; Robert Bramwell; Debra Weinfeld
- Running time: 42 minutes
- Production companies: 100% Womon Productions (season 1); Overbrook Entertainment (seasons 2–3); FanFare Productions; John Masius Productions (seasons 1–2); Sony Pictures Television

Original release
- Network: TNT
- Release: June 16, 2009 – August 16, 2011

Hawthorne (sometimes stylized HawthoRNe) is an American medical drama television series created by John Masius. It starred Jada Pinkett Smith and Michael Vartan and premiered on TNT on June 16, 2009. On September 16, 2010, it was announced that Hawthorne had been renewed for a third season consisting of ten episodes. The season premiered on June 14, 2011, and ended on August 16, 2011.

On September 2, 2011, it was announced that TNT had decided not to renew Hawthorne for a fourth season, so the season 3 finale, a cliffhanger, was the series finale.

== Premise ==
Christina Hawthorne is introduced as Chief Nursing Officer heading a group of nurses at Richmond Trinity Hospital in Richmond, Virginia. She is very passionate about her work and always advocates for her patients and her staff, even when it threatens her job. Richmond Trinity Hospital later closes and the staff is moved to James River Hospital. While acclimating to the new work atmosphere, she must also deal with a new relationship that she has formed with Dr. Tom Wakefield, the Chief of Surgery. Dr. Wakefield wants commitment and she is still unsure if she can become close with someone else. In season three they get married and face challenges including loss and infidelity.

== Episodes ==
Season	Episodes	Originally released	
Season	Episodes	First released	Last released
1	10	June 16, 2009	August 18, 2009
2	10	June 22, 2010	August 24, 2010
3	10	June 14, 2011	August 16, 2011

== Cast and characters ==
=== Main ===
- Jada Pinkett Smith as Christina Hawthorne, Chief Operation Officer COO & President of James River Hospital, Director of Nursing at James River Hospital, Former Chief Nursing Officer of Richmond Trinity Hospital
- Michael Vartan as Dr. Tom Wakefield, M.D., Chief of Surgery
- David Julian Hirsh as Nurse Ray Stein (seasons 1–2)
- Suleka Mathew as Charge Nurse Bobbie Jackson, Chief Nursing Officer of James River Hospital
- Christina Moore as Nurse Candy Sullivan (seasons 1–2; guest season 3)
- Hannah Hodson as Camille Hawthorne
- Vanessa Lengies as Scrub- Pediatric Charge Nurse Kelly Epson (seasons 2–3; recurring season 1)
- Marc Anthony as Detective Nick Renata (season 3; recurring season 2)
- Adam Rayner as Dr. Steve Shaw (season 3; recurring season 2)

=== Recurring ===
- Anne Ramsay as Dr. Brenda Marshall (seasons 1–3)
- James Morrison as John Morrissey, former CEO/ President of James River Hospital (seasons 1–3)
- Aisha Hinds as Isabel Walsh (seasons 1–2)
- Collins Pennie as Marcus Leeds (season 2)
- Vanessa Bell Calloway as Gail Strummer, Director of Nursing James River Hospital (seasons 2–3)
- Derek Luke as Dr. Miles Bourdet (season 3)

== Development and production ==
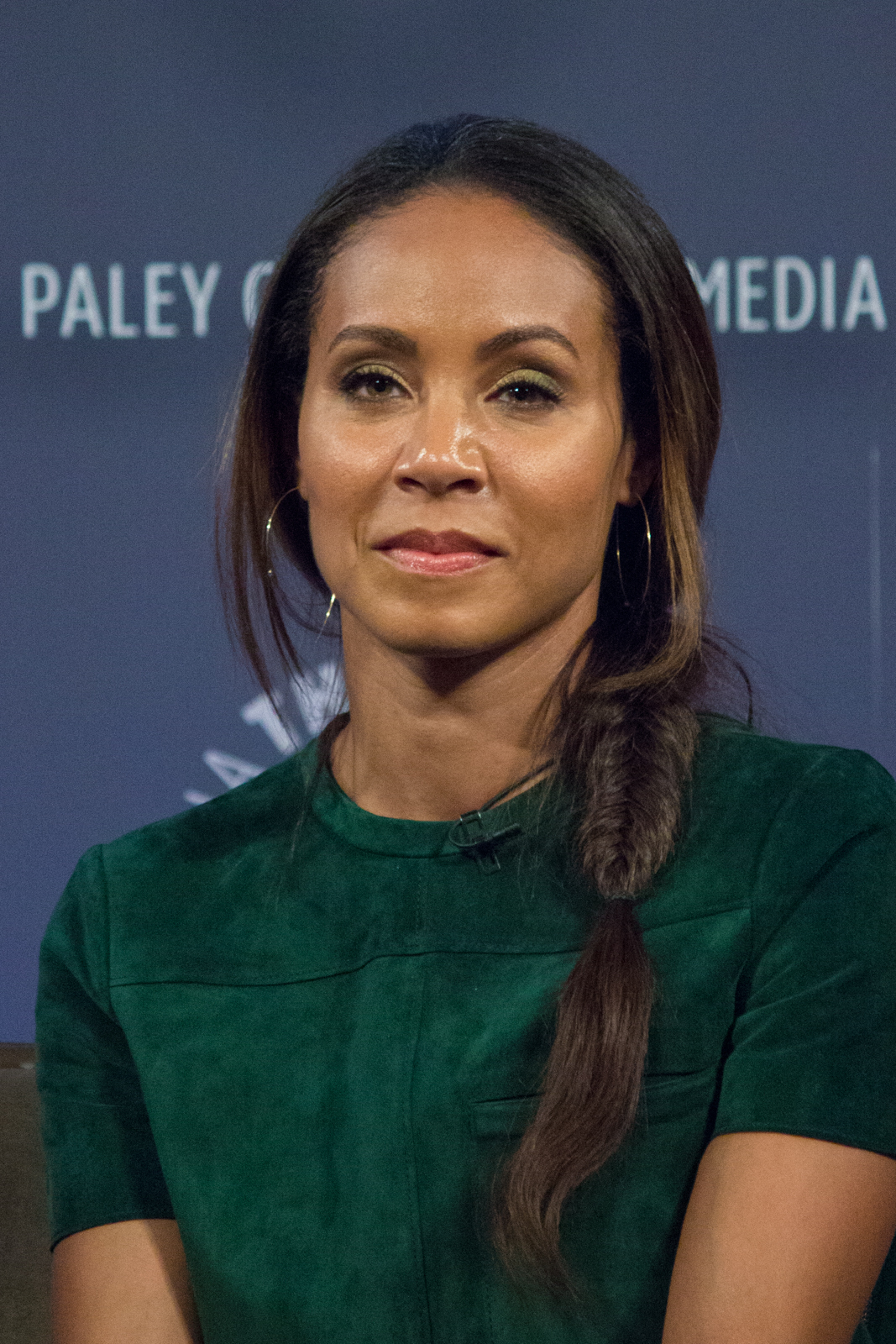
Jada Pinkett Smith was cast as the star of Hawthorne in September 2008.

John Masius created the program and served as executive producer for the first season. Glen Mazzara also served as executive producer for the first season. The program was initially going to be called Time Heals. Megan Branman and Dylann Brander of Branman/Brander Casting were involved in casting for the program. In September 2008, Jamie Tarses was reported to be an executive producer on the program.

In September 2008, The Press of Atlantic City reported that Jada Pinkett Smith signed on as both the star of the television pilot, and to serve as executive producer of the program. Pinkett Smith had previously promised never to work in television again, but changed her mind after reading the script of the pilot. She recalled getting the script from her manager: "He said, 'I would never send this to you if I didn't think it was fantastic.' I read it and then I let my husband read it. (Will) said to take the meeting and see." She decided to return to television because of the show's unique qualities.

In the pilot, Jeffrey Nordling portrayed Dr. Tom Wakefield, director of medicine. In February 2009, Michael Vartan was cast to co-star alongside Pinkett Smith as Dr. Tom Wakefield in the series. By June 6, 2009, the program's title had been changed to Hawthorne.

Masius continued on as executive producer in the second season. In September 2009, Glen Mazzara was named showrunner for the program's second season. Masius decided to name Mazzara as showrunner for the second season, citing a desire to focus more on writing.

== Home media ==
DVD name	Region 1 Release Date	Region 2 Release Date	Region 4 Release Date	Ep #	Discs	Additional information
Season 1	June 15, 2010	TBA	October 27, 2010	10	3	All in a Day's Work - A Conversation with Jada Pinkett Smith, Inside Richmond Trinity, Get to Know the Cast of HawthoRNe, HawthoRNe Medical School, Male Nurses and Shooting a Scene - Visual Effects and HawthoRNe's Heroes
Season 2	June 7, 2011	TBA	TBA	10	3	A New Season, Fresh Faces, Advanced Medicine, "I Run This" Photo Shoot and Cast Photo Shoot
Season 3	March 6, 2012	TBA	TBA	10	3	Outtakes and Pregnancy Pool Winner
The Complete Series	October 12, 2021	TBA	TBA	30	6	

== Broadcast ==
NBCUniversal International Networks - HawthoRNe began airing in Australia on Universal Channel.

== Reception ==
=== Critical response ===
Amy Amatangelo of the Boston Herald gave the program a grade of "D+", commenting: "'HawthoRNe' can't make a diagnosis. It's a comedy; it's a drama. It's a mess, fronted by Jada Pinkett Smith, making a return to series television as Christina Hawthorne, the chief nursing officer for Richmond Trinity Hospital and about the closest thing to a heavenly figure on the small screen since Roma Downey took flight on Touched by an Angel." In a review for Zap2it, Amatangelo commented "With each passing episode, they seem to be writing Christina (Jada Pinkett Smith) deeper and deeper into a corner. She can’t always be in an uproar about everything or always play the hero. The show cannot center around her at the expense of everyone else."

Greg Braxton of the Los Angeles Times noted, "Tom Shales in The Washington Post suggested 'HawthoRNe' is 'a show in need of emergency care.'"

In an assessment of the program for Bangor Daily News, Dale McGarrigle wrote that "It also pales in comparison to other original dramas on its own channel."

Alan Pergament of The Buffalo News was critical of the lead actress's decision to star in the series: "Jada Pinkett Smith, the actress married to film superstar Will Smith, must be getting a little bored lately. And now she is going to bore some of us. There is no other explanation for her decision to star in TNT's routine 'HawthoRNe' as the latest strong, flawed woman on the cable network."

Robert Bianco of USA Today wrote: "HawthoRNe would be terrible if it were the only series on TV and the only medical drama you'd ever seen. It's just too bad it's not TV's first medical show. At least it could get credit for inventing clichés instead of rehashing them." Of the lead actress's performance in the show, Bianco commented: "Pinkett Smith's Hawthorne is tired in every sense of the word, and she's not the only one. Every character and event falls under the category of painfully predictable."

Gail Pennington of the St. Louis Post-Dispatch commented that the Showtime program Nurse Jackie was superior to Hawthorne, writing: "Maybe if Showtime's 'Nurse Jackie' weren't so riveting, 'Hawthorne' wouldn't seem so weak. Or maybe 'Hawthorne,' the nurse drama headlined by Jada Pinkett Smith, would seem trite and derivative no matter what."

=== Ratings ===
The first episode of Hawthorne received 3.8 million viewers, with a debut at the 17th spot in the list of the "Top 20 cable network television shows for the week ending June 21, 2009". It placed directly below the Nickelodeon episode of iCarly, "iDate A Bad Boy", and above the USA Network program, In Plain Sight. By its 10th episode, the show's viewership had declined to 3.5 million.

Overall, the show's first season was beaten in the ratings among adults aged 25–54 by the new science fiction program Warehouse 13 produced by Syfy, and the medical drama Royal Pains produced by USA Network.

Season	Episodes	Original Airing			Viewers (in millions)
Season	Episodes	Season premiere	Season finale	TV season	Viewers (in millions)
1	10	June 16, 2009	August 18, 2009	2009	3.2
2	10	June 22, 2010	August 24, 2010	2010	3.6
3	10	June 14, 2011	August 16, 2011	2011	2.4

=== Awards and nominations ===
==== NAACP Image Awards ====
- 2010: Won—Outstanding Actress in a Drama Series for Jada Pinkett Smith
- 2010: Nominated—Outstanding Drama Series
- 2011: Nominated—Outstanding Actress in a Drama Series for Jada Pinkett Smith
- 2011: Nominated—Outstanding Supporting Actress in a Drama Series for Vanessa Bell Calloway
- 2011: Nominated—Outstanding Drama Series
- 2011: Won—OP Award

==== Prism Awards ====
- 2010: Nominated—Performance in a Drama Episode for Jada Pinkett Smith
- 2010: Nominated—Drama Series Episode—Substance Use

==== NAMIC Vision Awards ====
- 2010: Nominated—Drama
