= Hannah Hodson =

American actress, journalist and poet

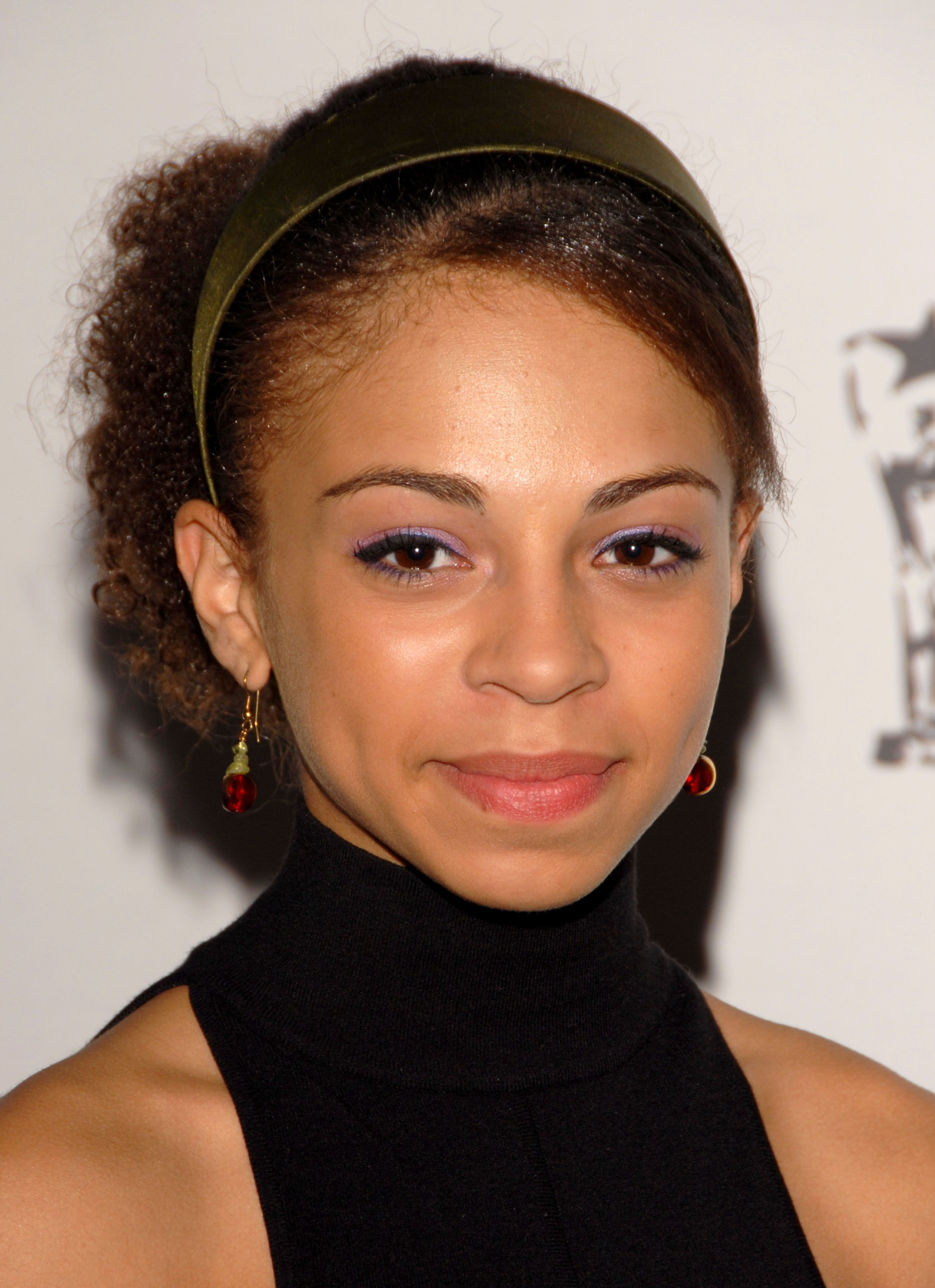
- Born: September 10, 1991 (age 34); San Francisco, California, U.S.
- Occupations: Actress, journalist, poet
- Years active: 2005–present

Hannah Hodson (born September 10, 1991) is an American actress, journalist, and poet. She played Shameika Wallace in the TNT television film The Ron Clark Story (2006), Camille Hawthorne on the TNT medical drama series Hawthorne (2009–2011), Becca in the science fiction film Campus Code (2015), and Lorna on the Showtime dark comedy series Happyish (2015).

== Early life ==
Hodson was born in San Francisco, California.

== Career ==
Hodson got her start in a Nike Air Jordan commercial directed by Spike Lee, who later cast her in his short film "Jesus Children of America," which premiered at the Venice Film Festival in 2005. She also starred in the TNT film special The Ron Clark Story as Shameika, for which she won a Young Artist's Award in 2007. She played Camille Hawthorne, daughter of Jada Pinkett-Smith's character Christina, in the 2009 TNT television drama series Hawthorne.

== Personal life ==
Hodson graduated from The Beacon School in 2009. In 2013, she graduated from Hampshire College, where she studied theater and black studies.

== Filmography ==
=== Film ===
| Year | Title | Role | Notes |
|---|---|---|---|
| 2005 | All the Invisible Children | Bianca | Short film Segment: "Jesus Children of America" |
| 2009 | The Greatest | Amy | |
| 2010 | The Family Tree | Ashley | |
| 2010 | My Soul to Take | Girl in Hallway #1 | |
| 2015 | Campus Code | Becca | |

=== Television ===
| Year | Title | Role | Notes |
|---|---|---|---|
| 2006 | The Ron Clark Story | Shameika Wallace | TV movie |
| 2009-2011 | Hawthorne | Camille Hawthorne | Main cast 30 episodes |
| 2010 | Blue Bloods | Yolanda | Episode: "Samaritan" |
| 2012 | I Just Want My Pants Back | Sarah | 1 episode: "Love Equation" |
| 2014 | The Following | Frat Girl | 1 episode: "Betrayal" |
| 2015 | Happyish | Lorna | Main cast 7 episodes |
| 2017–2019 | Happy! | Prostitute | 3 episodes |
| 2019 | Evil | Naomi Clark | 1 episode: "177 Minutes" |
| 2023 | Billions | Amanda Torre | 3 episodes |
