= Jade Healy =

Canadian production designer

- Born: Montreal, Quebec, Canada
- Occupations: Production designer, Art director
- Years active: 2004–present

Jade Healy is a Canadian production designer based in Los Angeles. She is known for her production design work on the films The Green Knight, Marriage Story, A Ghost Story, and I, Tonya.

== Career ==
Healy began her career as an assistant producer on Asia Argento's The Heart Is Deceitful Above All Things and then produced M. Blash's Lying. She has collaborated with film directors David Lowery, Ti West, Yorgos Lanthimos, Noah Baumbach, and Marielle Heller, among other directors.

== Filmography ==
As Production designer

- 2022 – Peter Pan & Wendy
- 2021 – The Green Knight
- 2019 – A Beautiful Day in the Neighborhood
- 2019 – Marriage Story
- 2017 – I, Tonya
- 2017 – The Killing of a Sacred Deer
- 2017 – A Ghost Story
- 2016 – Pete's Dragon
- 2016 – In a Valley of Violence
- 2015 – Mississippi Grind
- 2015 – James White
- 2014 – Jessabelle
- 2014 – Song One
- 2013 – The Last of Robin Hood
- 2013 – The Sacrament
- 2013 – Sunlight Jr.
- 2013 – Chlorine
- 2013 – Ain't Them Bodies Saints
- 2012 – The Normals
- 2012 – Best Man Down
- 2012 – Liberal Arts
- 2011 – Detachment
- 2011 – When Harry Tries to Marry
- 2011 – The Dish & the Spoon
- 2011 – The Innkeepers
- 2010 – Happythankyoumoreplease
- 2009 – The House of the Devil
- 2009 – Alexander the Last

As Set decorator

- 2009 – Cabin Fever 2: Spring Fever
- 2009 – The Good Guy
- 2009 – Rosencrantz and Guildenstern Are Undead
- 2008 – Death in Love
- 2008 – Hell Ride
- 2007 – The Blue Hour

== Awards and nominations ==
Year	Result	Award	Category	Work	Ref.
2022	Won	Seattle Film Critics Society	Best Production Design	The Green Knight	
2022	Nominated	Art Directors Guild	Fantasy Film	The Green Knight	
2022	Nominated	Georgia Film Critics Association	Best Production Design	The Green Knight	
2022	Nominated	Online Film Critics Society	Best Production Design	The Green Knight	
2022	Nominated	San Francisco Bay Area Film Critics Circle	Best Production Design	The Green Knight	
2020	Nominated	Art Directors Guild	Contemporary Film	A Beautiful Day in the Neighborhood	
