= Boston Society of Film Critics Awards 2017 =

Annual US film awards ceremony

38th BSFC Awards

December 10, 2017

Best Film:
Phantom Thread

The 38th Boston Society of Film Critics Awards, honoring the best in filmmaking in 2017, were given on December 10, 2017.

== Winners ==
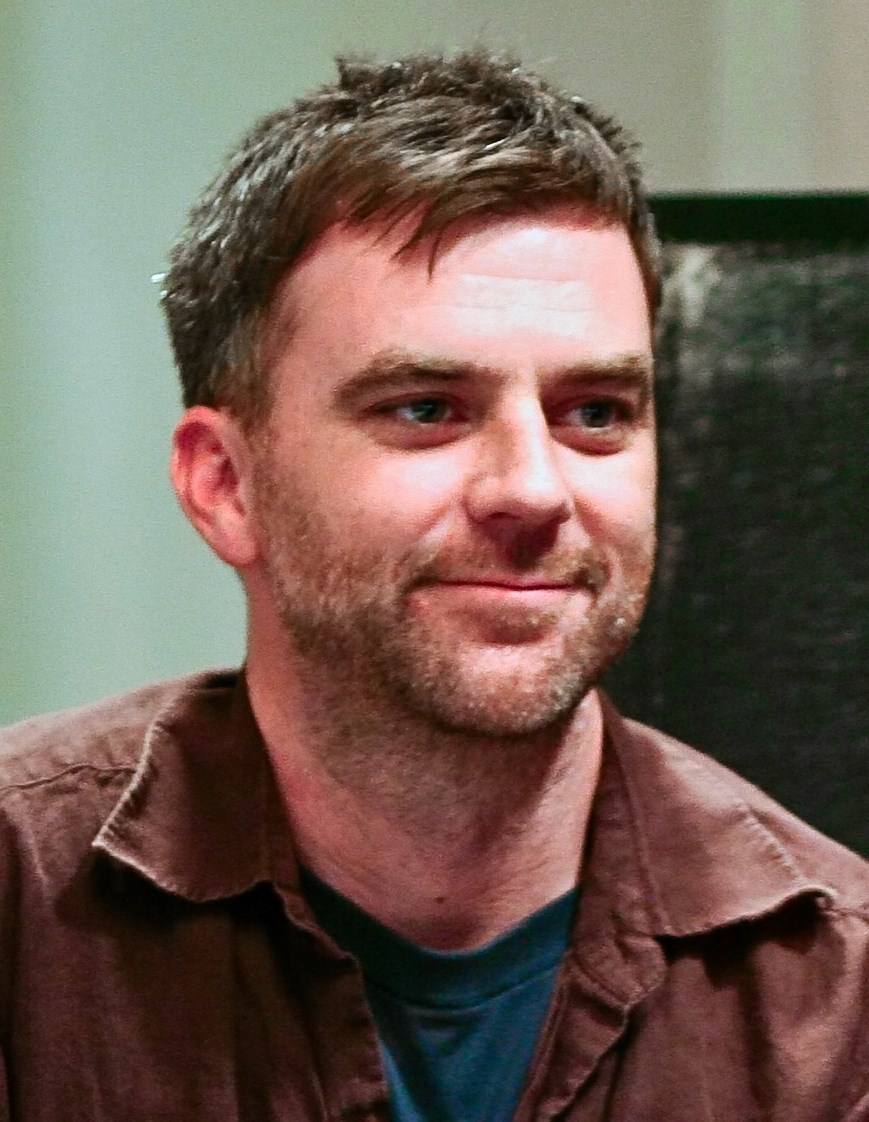
Paul Thomas Anderson, Best Director winner

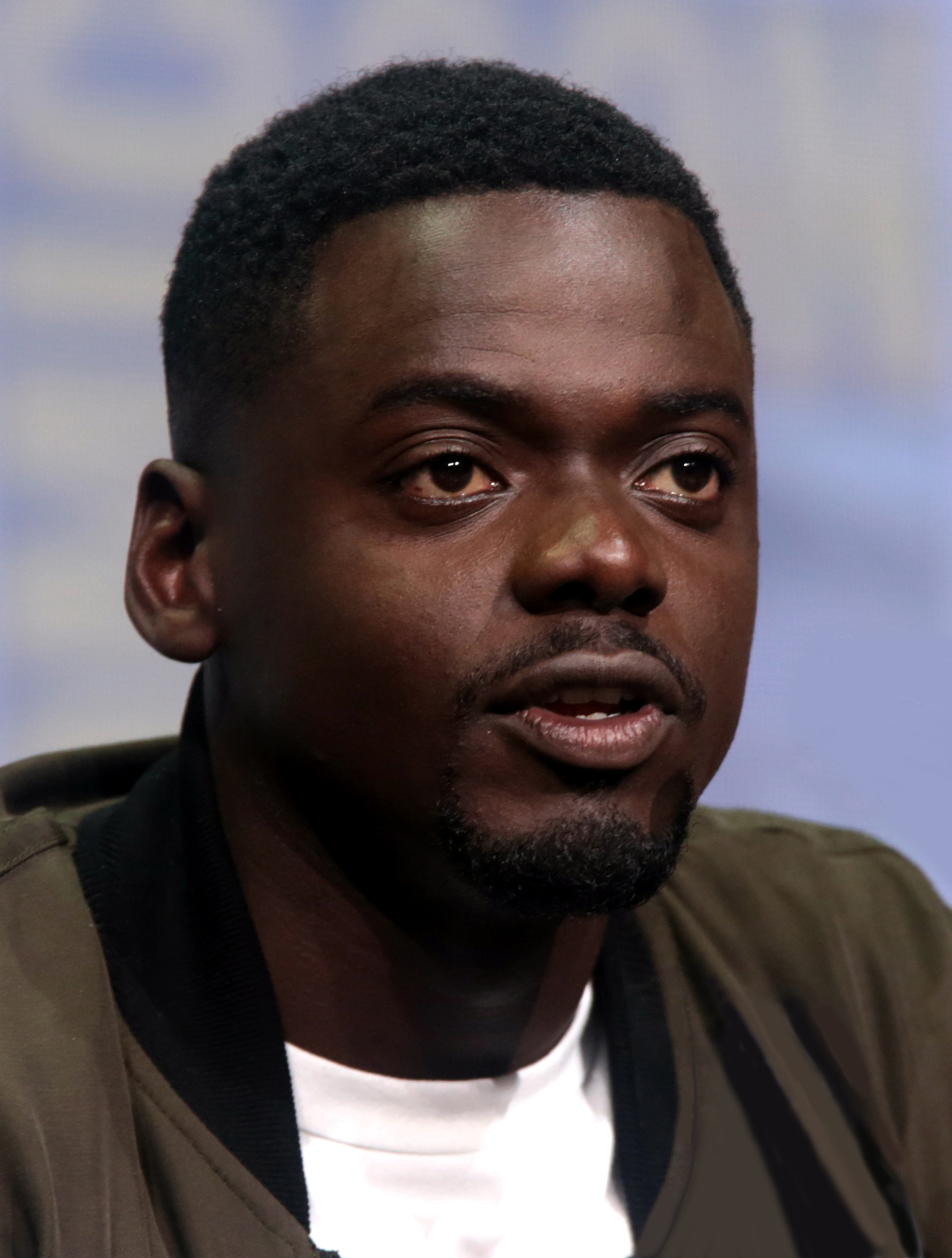
Daniel Kaluuya, Best Actor winner

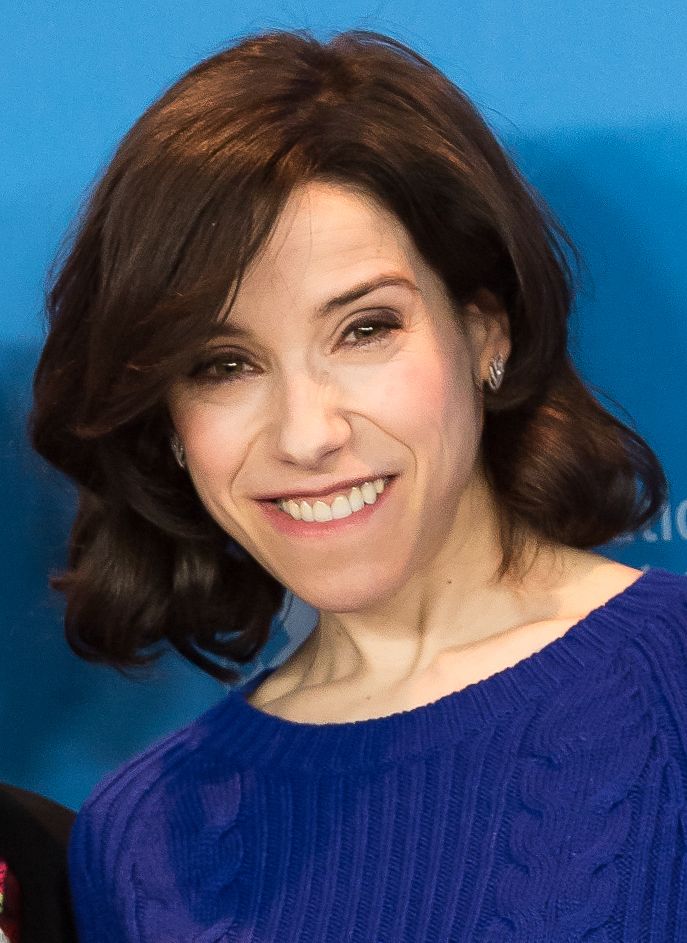
Sally Hawkins, Best Actress winner

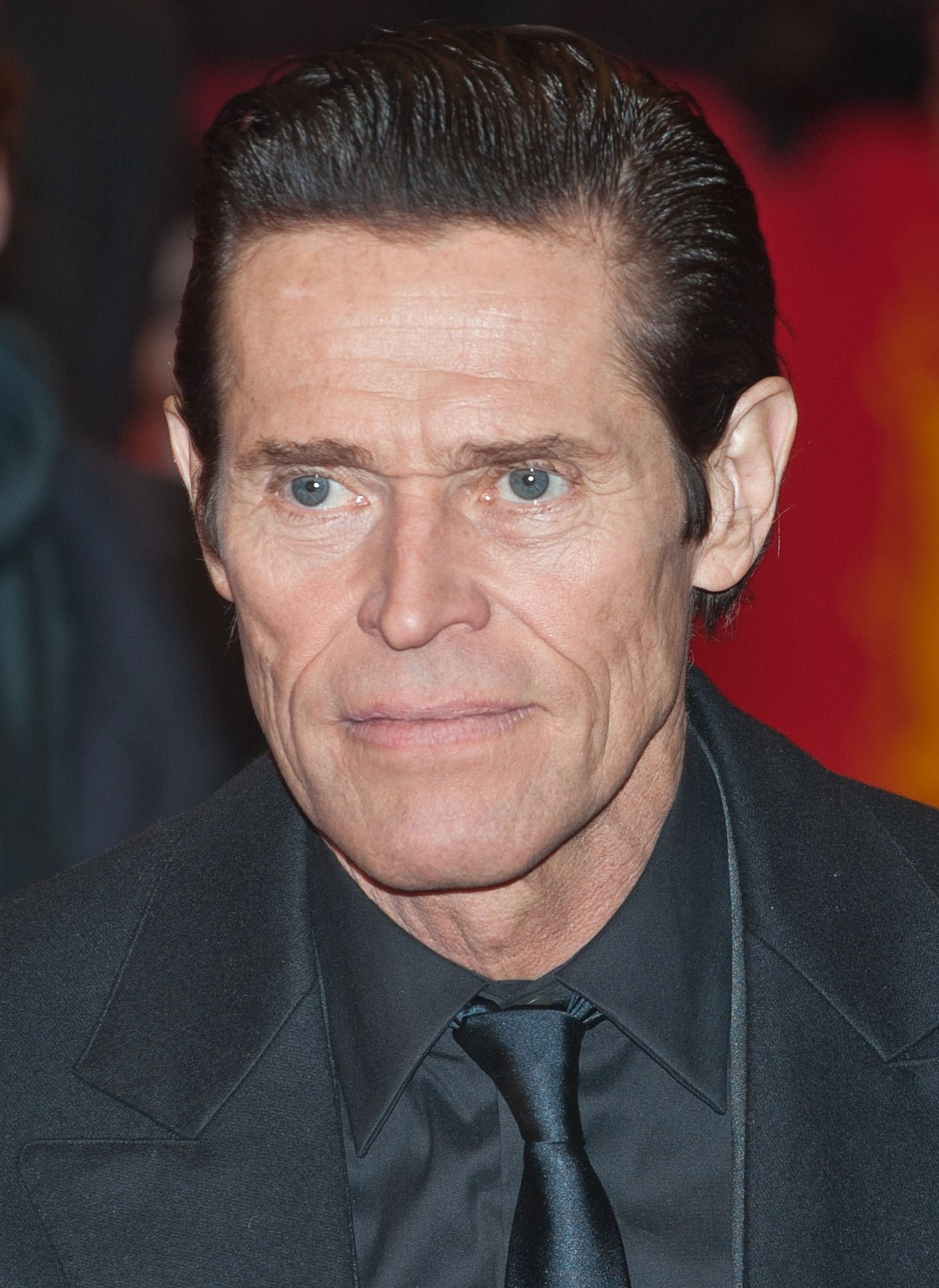
Willem Dafoe, Best Supporting Actor winner

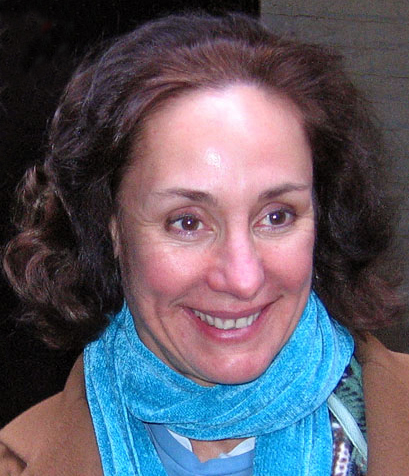
Laurie Metcalf, Best Supporting Actress winner

- Best Film:
  - Phantom Thread
  - Runner-up: The Shape of Water
- Best Director:
  - Paul Thomas Anderson – Phantom Thread
  - Runner-up: Guillermo del Toro – The Shape of Water
- Best Actor:
  - Daniel Kaluuya – Get Out
  - Runner-up: Timothée Chalamet – Call Me by Your Name
- Best Actress:
  - Sally Hawkins – The Shape of Water
  - Runner-up: Vicky Krieps – Phantom Thread
- Best Supporting Actor:
  - Willem Dafoe – The Florida Project
  - Runner-up: Sam Rockwell – Three Billboards Outside Ebbing, Missouri
- Best Supporting Actress:
  - Laurie Metcalf – Lady Bird
  - Runner-up: Allison Janney – I, Tonya
- Best Screenplay:
  - Greta Gerwig – Lady Bird
  - Runner-up: Jordan Peele – Get Out
- Best Original Score:
  - Jonny Greenwood – Phantom Thread
  - Runner-up: Alexandre Desplat – The Shape of Water
  - Runner-up: Alex Somers – Dawson City: Frozen Time
- Best Animated Film:
  - Coco
  - Runner-up: Loving Vincent
- Best Foreign Language Film:
  - The Square
  - Runner-up: BPM (Beats per Minute)
- Best Documentary:
  - Dawson City: Frozen Time
  - Runner-up: Faces Places
- Best Cinematography:
  - Hoyte van Hoytema – Dunkirk
  - Runner-up: Roger Deakins – Blade Runner 2049
- Best Editing:
  - David Lowery – A Ghost Story
  - Runner-up: Tatiana S. Riegel – I, Tonya
- Best New Filmmaker:
  - Jordan Peele – Get Out
- Best Ensemble Cast:
  - The Meyerowitz Stories
  - Runner-up: BPM (Beats per Minute)
