= The Green Knight (film) =

2021 film by David Lowery

- Theatrical release poster
- Directed by: David Lowery
- Screenplay by: David Lowery
- Based on: Sir Gawain and the Green Knight by the Gawain Poet
- Produced by: Toby Halbrooks; James M. Johnston; David Lowery; Tim Headington; Theresa Steele Page
- Starring: Dev Patel; Alicia Vikander; Joel Edgerton; Sarita Choudhury; Sean Harris; Ralph Ineson
- Cinematography: Andrew Droz Palermo
- Edited by: David Lowery
- Music by: Daniel Hart
- Production companies: A24; Ley Line Entertainment; Sailor Bear; BRON Studios; Wild Atlantic Pictures
- Distributed by: A24 (United States); Elevation Pictures (Canada)
- Release date: July 30, 2021
- Running time: 130 minutes
- Countries: United States; Canada
- Language: English
- Budget: $15 million
- Box office: $20 million

The Green Knight is a 2021 dark fantasy adventure film directed, written, produced, and edited by David Lowery. It is an adaptation from the 14th-century poem Sir Gawain and the Green Knight and stars Dev Patel as Gawain, who sets out on a journey to test his courage and face the Green Knight. It also stars Alicia Vikander (in a dual role), Joel Edgerton, Sarita Choudhury, Sean Harris, and Ralph Ineson as the titular character.

The Green Knight was theatrically released in the United States on July 30, 2021, by A24. The film received acclaim from critics for its cinematography, music, acting (particularly Patel's), production values, and Lowery's originality, direction, and writing. It grossed over $20 million against a budget of $15 million.

== Plot ==
Gawain is awakened on Christmas morning in a brothel by his lover, a commoner woman named Essel. He returns to Camelot, following a scolding by his mother.

Gawain attends a feast at the Round Table with his uncle the King, who invites Gawain to his side. In a tower, his mother performs a magic rite which summons the mysterious Green Knight, who barges into the court as they feast. He states that any knight able to land a blow on him will win his green axe, but must travel to the Green Chapel the following Christmas and receive an equal blow in return. Gawain takes up the challenge. The Knight yields and Gawain, wielding Excalibur, decapitates him. The Knight rises and lifts his severed head, reminds Gawain of the bargain and leaves.

After a year reveling, the King reminds Gawain to uphold his end of the challenge. Gawain departs on horseback for the Green Chapel, taking the green axe and a green girdle made by his mother, who claims that no harm will come to him so long as he wears it.

During his journey, Gawain meets a boy scavenging a battlefield littered with dead warriors. The boy directs Gawain to a stream that will lead him to the Green Chapel. He asks for payment and Gawain gives him a single coin. Shortly afterwards, the boy and two others ambush Gawain and steal the axe, girdle and horse, leaving him tied up. Gawain scrambles to his sword and uses it to cut the ropes binding his hands and pursues them.

By nightfall, Gawain arrives at an abandoned cottage and falls asleep in the bed. He is awakened by the ghost of a young woman named Winifred, who asks Gawain to retrieve her head from a nearby spring. He asks what he will receive in return but is rebuffed. He reunites her skull with her skeletal remains and the next morning finds the axe has been returned to him.

Gawain befriends a red fox who accompanies him on his journey where they see some giants. He reaches a castle inhabited by a Lord who informs him that the Green Chapel is nearby, and Gawain accepts his invitation to stay.

The Lady of the castle, who resembles Essel, makes seductive overtures towards Gawain. The Lord proposes they exchange what he obtains while hunting with whatever Gawain finds at the castle. The next morning, the Lady presents Gawain with the green girdle, which she claims to have made herself. Gawain accedes to her advances in exchange for it. He then flees and encounters the Lord in the forest. The Lord kisses Gawain in return for his Lady's actions, but Gawain does not give him the girdle. The Lord reveals that he has captured Gawain's fox and releases it.

Gawain reaches a stream where a boat is waiting. The fox speaks, imploring Gawain to abandon the quest. Gawain takes the boat to the chapel, where the Knight is seated in hibernation. Gawain waits through the night, and the Green Knight awakens on Christmas morning. As the Knight swings the axe Gawain flinches. The Knight chides him. Gawain kneels for the blow again but at the last moment scrambles away while apologizing on the way out. He finds his horse outside the chapel and rides back home.

Gawain flees back to Camelot, where he is knighted and becomes king after his uncle's death. Essel bears his son, but Gawain abandons her, taking the child and marrying a noblewoman instead. His son comes of age and dies in battle. Many years later, Gawain has become a reviled king. With his castle under siege and his wife, daughter, and mother abandoning him, he removes the green girdle, and his head falls from his shoulders.

It is revealed that this future was just a vision. The kneeling Gawain removes the girdle, telling the Knight he is ready. The Knight praises Gawain for his bravery, drags his finger across Gawain's throat and points past him, stating "Now, off with your head". He smiles kindly.

== Cast ==
- Dev Patel as Sir Gawain, a headstrong knight
- Alicia Vikander as:
  - Essel, a commoner woman that Sir Gawain secretly dates. This character is unique to the film adaptation.
  - The Lady, (Note: Despite being identified as Lady Bertilak, she is credited as "The Lady".) a noblewoman that tries to seduce Gawain
- Joel Edgerton as the Lord, (Note: Despite being identified as Lord Bertilak, he is credited as "The Lord".) a nobleman who gives Gawain directions to the Green Chapel
- Sarita Choudhury as Mother, (Note: Despite being identified as Morgan le Fay, she is credited as "Mother".) a sorceress who is Gawain's mother
- Sean Harris as the King, (Note: Despite being identified as King Arthur, he is credited as "King".) the ruler of Camelot and Gawain's maternal uncle
- Ralph Ineson as the Green Knight, a mysterious knight. He possesses wood-like skin.
- Barry Keoghan as the Scavenger, an unnamed man who robs Gawain
- Erin Kellyman as Winifred, the ghost of a woman who Gawain helps out
- Kate Dickie as the Queen, (Note: Despite being identified as Queen Guinevere, she is credited as "Queen".) the Queen of Camelot and Gawain's aunt
- Atheena Frizzell as Youngest Sister
- Nita Mishra as Older Sister
- Tara McDonagh as Middle Sister
- Emmet O'Brien as the Magician, (Note: Despite being identified as Merlin, he is credited as "Magician".) a wizard who is an ally of the Lord
- Helena Browne as the Sightless Woman
- Megan Tiernan as Gawain's Young Queen, a noblewoman in Gawain's possible future
- Sam Uppal Lynch as Gawain's son (age 7), the unnamed son of Gawain in his possible future
  - Adam Karim as Gawain's son (age 17)
- Ruth Patel as Gawain's daughter (age 4), the unnamed daughter of Gawain in his possible future
- Rose Patel as Gawain's daughter (age 6)

An uncredited voice actor voices the red fox that becomes Gawain's companion.

The giants that Gawain and his red fox companion encounter are motion-captured by Andrea Deaskovic, Melinda Dempsey, Aoibheann Garry, Isabel Friosi, Rachel Quinn, Hannah Sjoden, and Lucy Waters.

== Production ==
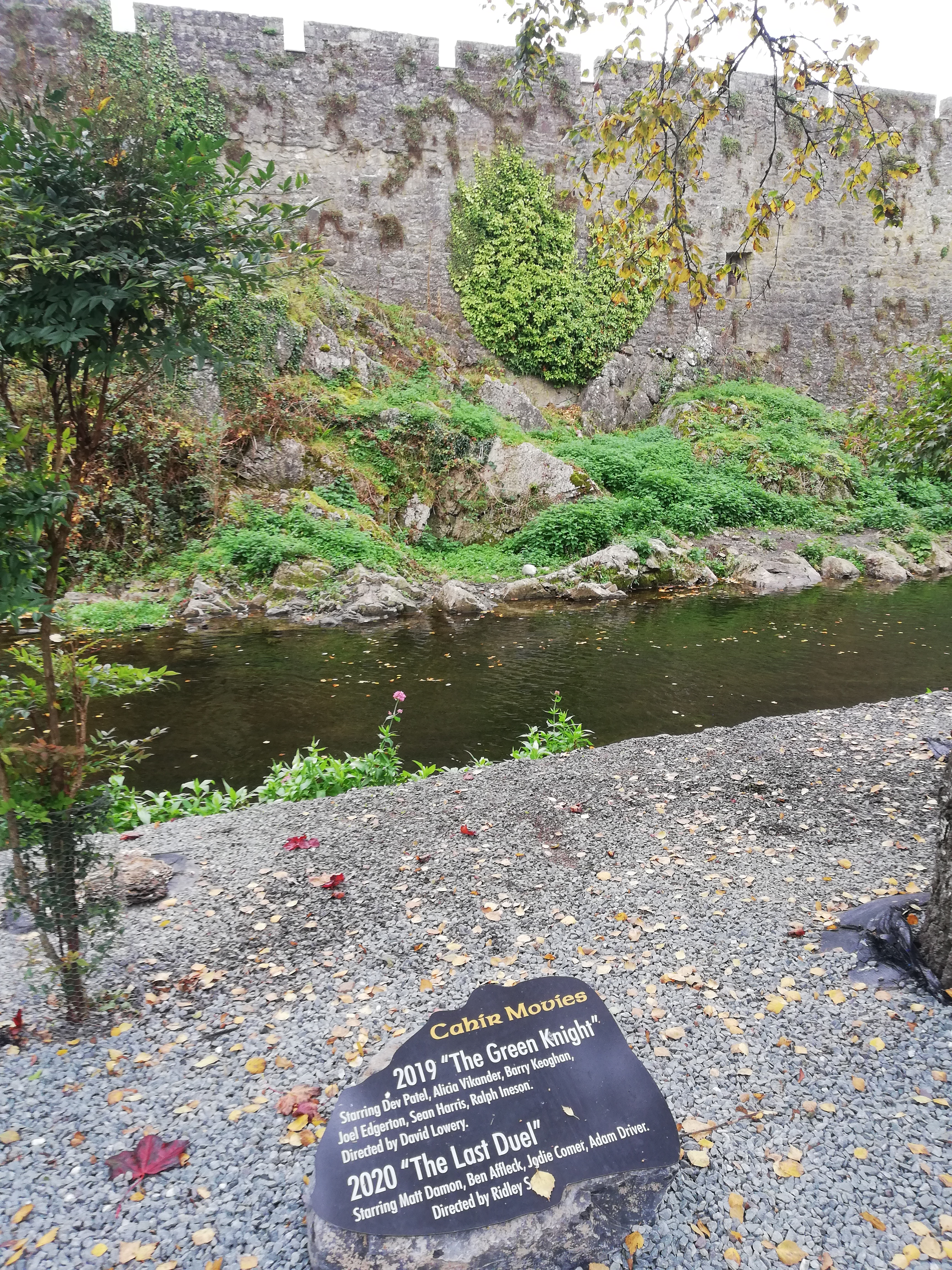
Plaque at Cahir Castle, Ireland, commemorating its use as a filming location for The Green Knight.

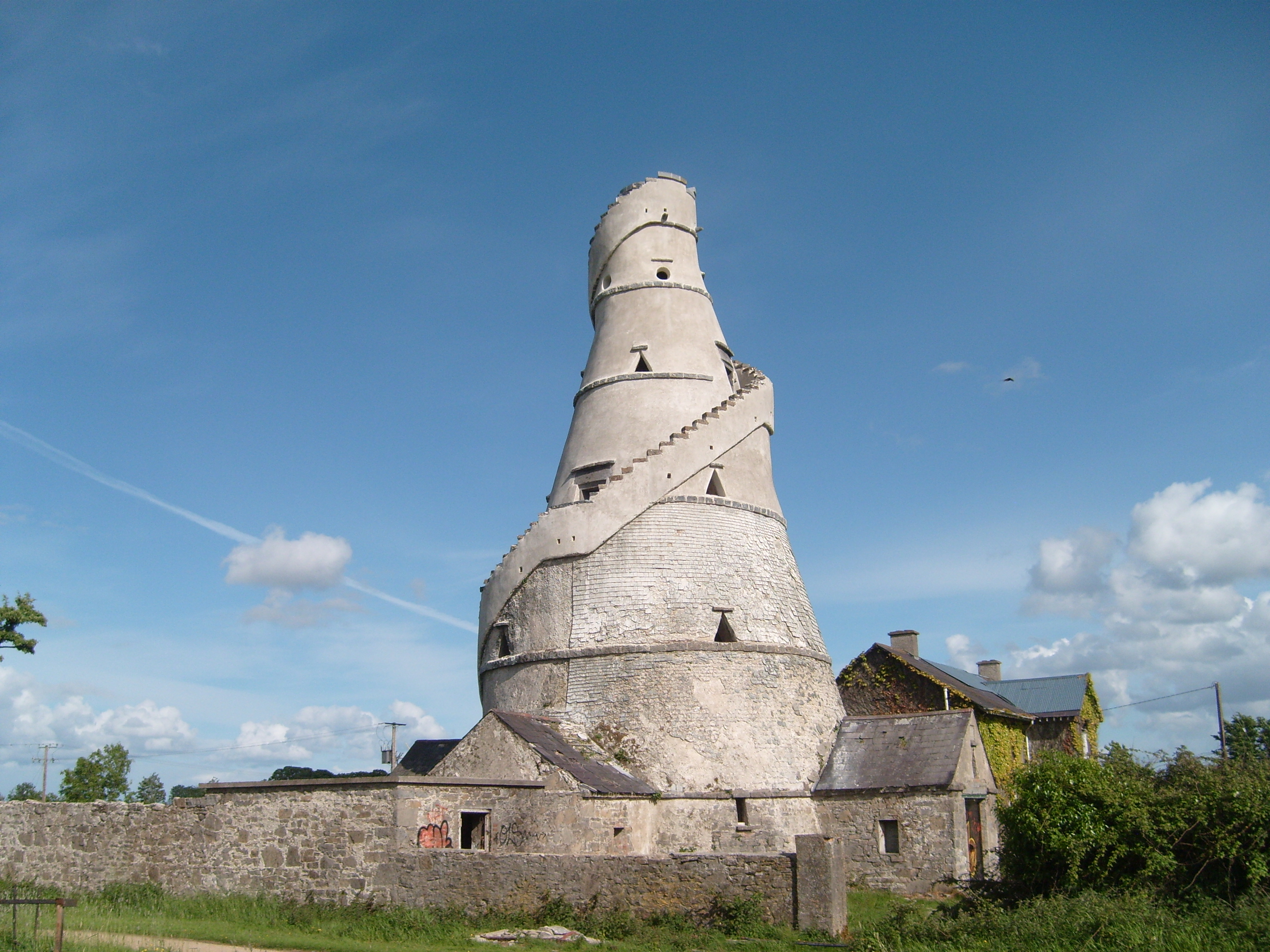
The Wonderful Barn, used for filming as the "crooked tower."

It was announced in November 2018 that David Lowery would direct and write a modern retelling of the 14th-century tale Sir Gawain and the Green Knight, with A24, Ley Line Entertainment, and Bron Studios set to finance.

In March 2019, Dev Patel was announced to be in negotiations to star in the film. That month, Barry Keoghan and Ralph Ineson joined the cast. In April 2019, it was announced Alicia Vikander and Erin Kellyman had been cast.

Principal photography began in Ireland in March 2019. Ardmore Studios and Cahir Castle, County Tipperary, were used as filming locations, as was Charleville Castle in Tullamore, County Offaly.

Weta Digital created the visual effects.

Lowery was inspired by fantasy films of the 1980s such as Willow and Excalibur. Initially, while writing the script, Lowery did not intend for Morgan le Fay to be Gawain's mother, but felt that altering the story this way allowed for her to be more naturally introduced into the narrative. Lowery stated that the intercut scenes of le Fay casting the spell that summons the Green Knight were not part of the original screenplay. However, Lowery was impressed with actress Sarita Choudhury's work with the character and the scene was written and storyboarded to be included in the Round Table scene. Lowery spent well over a year editing the scene together. The decision to design le Fay's spell in the form of a handwritten letter was also due to Lowery's fondness for letter writing, found in his other works as well.

The inclusion of Saint Winifred was inspired by the mention of the Holy Head (Holywell) in the original poem.

The highway robbery is an allusion to the 1975 film Barry Lyndon, while the battlefield where Gawain first encounters the robber is inspired by the Battle of Badon. While Gawain's ultimate fate is left ambiguous at the end of the film, Lowery originally shot a more "explicit" and "definitive" ending, but felt that it would affect audiences' feelings coming away from the film.

Set designs, such as the scene at the Round Table, included hand painted matte paintings to extend the set, a technique Lowery favored from films in the '80s and '90s. Time constraints with shooting forced cinematographer Andrew Droz Palermo and production designer Jade Healy to plan how lighting would be built into the Round Table scene ahead of time.

Costume designer Malgosia Turzanska drew upon South American designs when designing the crowns worn by the Lord and Guinevere. Lowery also felt the designs reinforced the "saintly" status of Arthur and Guinevere as representations of Western Christianity. The decorative plaques on Arthur's cloak referenced the creative team's various interpretations of King Arthur, and included references to Lowery's other works, such as A Ghost Story. Turzanska also designed the golden cape worn by Gawain to represent the character's golden mantle from the original poem.

No digital visual effects were used in creating the Green Knight during the Round Table scene. Lowery preferred this in order to give the character presence on set. Actor Ralph Ineson wore wood-like prosthetics designed by Barry Gower. Scenes involving the horse alternated with a false mount that was wheeled around with a dolly, after the initial horse used for the scenes would not cooperate with Ineson. Lowery stated that the crew used practical effects to make the Green Knight appear larger, such as mounting Ineson on platforms. Digital effects were later used during the Green Knight's hibernation scene, including subtly transforming the knight's face into that of the other cast members. Speaking about the subtle humor and lightness incorporated into the otherwise dark script, Lowery stated that near the end of the film, he directed Ineson to portray the Green Knight as Santa Claus.

Another major influence on the film was Bram Stoker’s Dracula (1992) by Francis Ford Coppola. According to Lowery, this is one of his all-time favorite films, and its use of practical effects, dissolves and old-fashioned cinema tricks has always inspired him. He paid deliberate homage to the film in the scene where St. Winifred first approaches Gawain in her cottage.

== Themes ==
=== Integrity and character ===
Lowery describes the film as being about the importance of comporting oneself with integrity and goodness over being concerned with one's legacy. Though the question of Gawain's ultimate fate is left intentionally ambiguous, Lowery stated that he wanted the possibility of Gawain being beheaded to be "a positive thing ... He faces his fate bravely, and there's honor and integrity in that. But that doesn't mean that he's dead, he's killed. He received the blow that he was dealt, and all is set right within the universe of the film." The after-credits scene showing a young girl putting on a crown has been seen as "a tease of an alternate life that Gawain leads as king of Camelot, with his daughter (possibly even mothered by Essel) a sign of the happiness he found."

=== Familial relationships ===
The complicated relationship between Morgan le Fay and Gawain written for the film also evoked Lowery's experiences with his mother and needing to be pushed to stand on his own as an adult.

=== Women ===
Erasing and ignoring the presence of women is a prevalent theme. Gawain's attitude toward women as easily overlooked and forgotten is reflected in both the original poem and the film.

=== Nature ===
The film deals with the conflict between mankind and nature. Lowery stated that monologue by Vikander's Lady Bertilak reflects both the symbolism of Arthurian Christian civilization being in conflict with paganism and nature and his own sentiment that nature will inevitably win over civilization and bring peace. The Green Knight's depiction as a tree-like entity also depicts nature and paganism invading the dull sanctum of the Round Table and Arthur's kingdom. This is further emphasized by Lowery's decision to portray Arthur and Guinevere as sickly, alluding to the waning control of the civilization they represent.

== Release ==
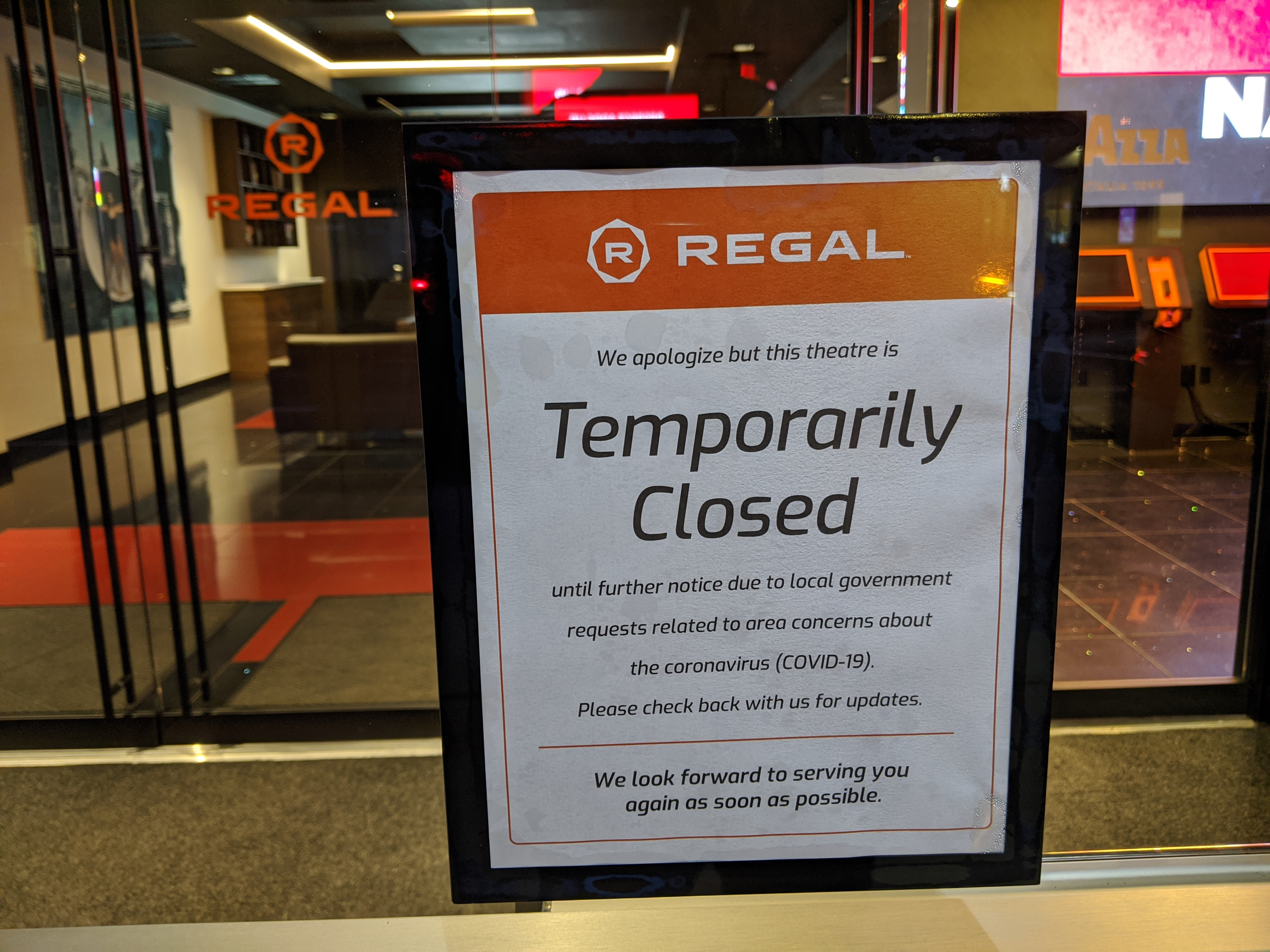
The mass closures of cinemas brought on by the COVID-19 pandemic forced the release of The Green Knight to be delayed from May 2020 to July 2021.

Originally, The Green Knight was scheduled to have its world premiere at the South by Southwest film festival (SXSW) on March 16, 2020, with a full theatrical release following on May 29. The COVID-19 pandemic, however, forced the cancellation of SXSW and a mass closure of movie theatres worldwide. With no timeframe for when cinemas might reopen, some studios opted to release their new films through video on demand (VOD). Lowery told the A24 Project podcast and IndieWire that he would prefer The Green Knight to see a theatrical release, but that he was ultimately not in control over whether or not it opened on VOD.

Later, Lowery revealed that he would have been unhappy with the cut of The Green Knight that was set to debut at SXSW, and that he spent six months during the pandemic re-editing the film into something with which he could be satisfied. In December 2020, A24 announced that The Green Knight would receive a theatrical-only release, opening in US cinemas on July 30, 2021. One streaming video option was available in the US: The A24 Screening Room allowed viewers to purchase a $20 ticket that allowed them to stream The Green Knight, with an additional Q&A session with the cast and crew, during a four-hour window of their choice on the night of August 18. Although the US release progressed as planned, Entertainment Film Distributors chose to pull The Green Knight from UK cinemas two weeks before its scheduled theatrical release on August 6, citing the surge in COVID-19 cases from the Delta variant. After some deliberation, Entertainment opted to release The Green Knight simultaneously in theaters and through Amazon Prime Video on September 24 in the UK.

As part of a partnership between A24 and IMAX, the film was re-released exclusively in IMAX theaters for one night only on December 11, 2024.

=== Home media ===
The Green Knight was released on 4K Ultra HD Blu-ray, Blu-ray, DVD, and digitally through Lionsgate Home Entertainment on October 12, 2021. While the Blu-ray release contained a number of special features that highlighted certain elements of the film's production, no deleted or alternate scenes from The Green Knight were included.

== Reception ==
=== Box office ===
The Green Knight grossed $17.1 million in the United States and Canada, and $2.8 million in other territories, for a worldwide total of $20 million.

In the United States and Canada, The Green Knight was released alongside Jungle Cruise and Stillwater, and was projected to gross around $4 million from 2,790 theaters in its opening weekend. The film made $2.9 million on its first day, including $750,000 from Thursday night previews. It ended up slightly over-performing, debuting to $6.8 million and finished second at the box office behind Jungle Cruise. The film played best in big markets such as New York City, Los Angeles, and San Francisco. The film fell 62% to $2.6 million in its second weekend, finishing sixth, then made $1.6 million in its third weekend.

=== Critical response ===
On review aggregator Rotten Tomatoes, the film has an approval rating of 89% based on 331 reviews, with an average rating of 8/10. The site's critics consensus reads, "The Green Knight honors and deconstructs its source material in equal measure, producing an absorbing adventure that casts a fantastical spell." Metacritic assigned the film a weighted average score of 85 out of 100 based on 56 critics, indicating "universal acclaim". Audiences polled by CinemaScore gave the film an average grade of "C+" on an A+ to F scale.

Writing for Vulture, Alison Willmore said that the film "is about someone who keeps waiting for external forces to turn him into the gallant, heroic figure he believes he should be", and added: "at the film's heart is a lesson that's as timeless as any legend — travel as far as you like, but you'll never be able to leave yourself behind." Brian Tallerico of RogerEbert.com gave the film a score of 4 out of 4 stars, describing the film as "one of the most memorable films of the year, a fascinating swirl of masculinity, temptation, heroism, and religion", adding: "It's a film that embeds the concept of storytelling and performance into its narrative ... while also weaving its own enchanting spell on audiences." Barry Hertz of The Globe and Mail described the film as "a beautiful, haunting and enigmatic work that reckons with the folklore's grave and tragic elements to deliver a masterpiece of blood, sex and magic", and praised Patel's performance as Gawain. John Nugent of Empire gave the film a score of 5 out of 5 stars, describing it as "a rivetingly weird and exceptionally beautiful fantasy film that offers no easy answers but ponders the biggest questions", and wrote that the film was "Revisionist Fantasy, doing for the genre what the likes of Robert Altman or Alejandro Jodorowsky did with their Revisionist Westerns: bringing an avant-garde flair and an ambiguous morality to a previously occasionally cheesy and childlike world."

Keith Watson of Slant Magazine gave the film a score of 2.5 out of 4 stars, describing it as "a self-consciously revisionist take on Camelot lore", and wrote that the film "smooths out the enduring mysteries, opaque psychology, and narrative idiosyncrasies of Sir Gawain and the Green Knight, resulting in a work that's only superficially more daring and enigmatic than its source material." Simon Abrams of TheWrap wrote that "while there's a lot of commendable chutzpah and curious longing baked into The Green Knight, the movie's never as compelling as it is unusual."

In December 2024, Collider ranked the film at number 2 on its list of the "10 Best Fantasy Movies of the 2020s," with Robert Lee III writing "David Lowery has always succeeded in this type of somber, yet undeniably large-scale filmmaking, with The Green Knight easily being the director's magnum opus." In June 2025, IndieWire ranked the film at number 45 on its list of "The 100 Best Movies of the 2020s (So Far)".

=== Accolades ===
Award	Date of ceremony	Category	Recipient(s)	Result	Ref.
Hollywood Music in Media Awards	November 17, 2021	Original Score — Independent Film	Daniel Hart	Nominated	
Gotham Awards	November 29, 2021	Best Feature	The Green Knight	Nominated	
Gotham Awards	November 29, 2021	Best Screenplay	David Lowery	Nominated	
National Board of Review Awards	December 2, 2021	Top Independent Films	The Green Knight	Won	
Detroit Film Critics Society Awards	December 6, 2021	Best Director	David Lowery	Nominated	
Detroit Film Critics Society Awards	December 6, 2021	Best Adapted Screenplay	David Lowery	Nominated	
Washington D.C. Area Film Critics Association Awards	December 6, 2021	Best Film	The Green Knight	Nominated	
Washington D.C. Area Film Critics Association Awards	December 6, 2021	Best Director	David Lowery	Nominated	
Washington D.C. Area Film Critics Association Awards	December 6, 2021	Best Cinematography	Andrew Droz Palermo	Nominated	
Society of Composers & Lyricists Awards	March 8, 2022	Outstanding Original Score for an Independent Film	Daniel Hart	Won	
Critics' Choice Super Awards	March 17, 2022	Best Science Fiction/Fantasy Movie	The Green Knight	Nominated	
Critics' Choice Super Awards	March 17, 2022	Best Actor in a Science Fiction/Fantasy Movie	Dev Patel	Won	
Critics' Choice Super Awards	March 17, 2022	Best Actress in a Science Fiction/Fantasy Movie	Alicia Vikander	Nominated	
Hugo Awards	September 4, 2022	Best Dramatic Presentation, Long Form	David Lowery	Nominated	
Saturn Awards	October 25, 2022	Best Fantasy Film	The Green Knight	Nominated	

== See also ==
- Matter of Britain
- List of works based on Arthurian legends
