= Toby Halbrooks =

American filmmaker

- Born: 1978 (age 47–48); Dallas, Texas
- Occupations: Film director, producer, writer, musician
- Known for: Ain't Them Bodies Saints; Upstream Color; Pete's Dragon; A Ghost Story; The Green Knight

Toby Halbrooks (born 1978) is an American film producer, writer, director, and former musician. He initially gained prominence as a member of the band The Polyphonic Spree, before becoming a noted producer in independent film, frequently collaborating with filmmaker David Lowery and partner James M. Johnston through their production company Sailor Bear.

== Early life ==
Halbrooks was raised in Dallas, Texas.

== Career ==
=== Music ===
He toured internationally as a multi-instrumentalist with the symphonic rock band The Polyphonic Spree for six years before transitioning into directing and producing.

=== Filmmaking ===
Halbrooks's first significant film project was producing Lowery's short film Pioneer (2011), which premiered at the Sundance Film Festival and was also shown at Cannes. He subsequently co-produced Shane Carruth’s Upstream Color and produced Ain't Them Bodies Saints, both premiering at Sundance in 2013. For Ain't Them Bodies Saints, Halbrooks and co-producer James M. Johnson won the 2023 Indian Paintbrush Producer's Award. They also received nominations for the 17th annual Piaget Producers Award.

In 2014, Halbrooks directed his debut short film Dig, which premiered at Sundance. He co-wrote Disney’s live-action Pete's Dragon (2016) alongside David Lowery. Writing for the Chicago Tribune, Michael Phillips praised Lowery and Halbrooks' writing, and went on to describe the film as "one of the season's most heartening surprises."

In 2017, Halbrooks and Johnston produced Person to Person, a drama which featured an ensemble cast including Michael Cera and Abbi Jacobson.

He co-produced A Ghost Story (2017), for which he also co-wrote a song with Lowery, Andrew Tinker, and Kesha. The song, titled Last One, was performed by Stereo Jane for the film's soundtrack. He also co-produced The Old Man & the Gun (2018), Miss Juneteenth (2020), and The Green Knight (2021). Halbrooks also co-wrote the screenplay for Disney's Peter Pan & Wendy (2023) with Lowery.

In 2023, he began production on Mother Mary, directed by Lowery and starring Anne Hathaway and Michaela Coel, produced by A24.
