= Mother Mary (2026 film) =

2026 film by David Lowery

- Theatrical release poster
- Directed by: David Lowery
- Written by: David Lowery
- Produced by: Toby Halbrooks; Jeanie Igoe; James M. Johnston; David Lowery; Jonas Katzenstein; Maximilian Leo; Jonathan Saubach
- Starring: Anne Hathaway; Michaela Coel; Hunter Schafer; Atheena Frizzell; Kaia Gerber; Jessica Brown Findlay; Alba Baptista; Sian Clifford; FKA Twigs
- Cinematography: Andrew Droz Palermo; Rina Yang
- Edited by: David Lowery
- Music by: Daniel Hart
- Production companies: Homebird Productions; augenschein Filmproduktion
- Distributed by: A24 (United States); Leonine Studios (Germany)
- Release dates: April 17, 2026 (United States); May 21, 2026 (Germany)
- Running time: 112 minutes
- Countries: United States; Germany
- Language: English
- Budget: $20 million
- Box office: $3 million

Mother Mary is a 2026 psychological drama film written and directed by David Lowery. The film stars Anne Hathaway, Michaela Coel, Hunter Schafer, Atheena Frizzell, Kaia Gerber, Jessica Brown Findlay, Alba Baptista, Sian Clifford, and FKA Twigs. It follows a pop star (Hathaway) whose reunion with her former costume designer (Coel) forces her to confront her past.

The film received a limited theatrical release in the United States by A24 on April 17, 2026, before opening wide on April 24. It received mixed reviews from critics and grossed $3 million against its $20 million budget.

== Plot ==
Mother Mary, a world-famous musical artist, prepares to mount a comeback performance in the wake of an onstage accident. Overwhelmed during a costume fitting, she flees to the English countryside to seek out fashion designer Sam Anselm, her estranged lover and collaborator. With three days until Mary's show, Sam begrudgingly agrees to design her a dress.

Tensions rise as they make preparations at Sam's barn-turned-workshop, and Mary struggles to explain her vision for the dress. Sam questions her about the upcoming performance and her accident, which some suspect was a suicide attempt. She refuses to listen to Mary's new song, forcing her to perform the choreography without music. Suggesting a long train made from her previous iconic dresses to be torn away onstage, Sam recognizes that Mary is desperate for personal and artistic clarity.

Old resentments are laid bare as a vengeful Sam forces Mary to confront the end of their close creative partnership: despite them launching Mary's career together, Sam was denied credit and cut out of her inner circle. Sam explains that she has not listened to Mary's music since being visited by a ghost. At a concert after their estrangement, her bitterness toward Mary resulted in a broken tooth, and she awoke after having it removed to discover the wound had released a spectral figure of red cloth.

Mary reveals that she saw the same ghost after a séance with her team where Imogen, a fan possessed by a mysterious spirit, cut open Mary's hand. That night, the red ghost appeared to Mary and attempted to enter her wound, but she escaped. Exhausted by her demanding tour, she was confronted by the ghost during a concert and severely injured, falling as the spirit inhabited her. Though recovered from the accident, she remains haunted by the ghost now inside her.

Sam leads a reluctant Mary in a ritual to exorcise the spirit, using her dressmaking tools and invoking their past collaborations. Taking Sam's shears, Mary slices open her own chest and Sam pulls out the ghost, turning the spirit of their mutual trauma into harmless fabric. Mary apologizes for having wronged Sam and her team rushes her to the show, while Sam is inspired to craft the red fabric into a dress. Her assistant Hilda describes Mary taking the stage, shedding her original costume and dedicating her song to Sam, who envisions Mother Mary in the finished dress.

== Cast ==
- Anne Hathaway as Mother Mary
- Michaela Coel as Sam Anselm
- Hunter Schafer as Hilda
- Sian Clifford as Jade
- Atheena Frizzell as Emily
- FKA Twigs as Imogen
- Jessica Brown Findlay as Tessa
- Kaia Gerber as Nikki
- Alba Baptista as Miel Contrera
- Isaura Barbé-Brown as Kyla

== Production ==
The project was announced in March 2023. David Lowery was to write and direct the film, and Michaela Coel and Anne Hathaway were announced to star. In May and October 2023, respectively, Hunter Schafer and Sian Clifford joined the cast. In March 2024, FKA Twigs was revealed to have a role in the film. It was co-financed with A24, Topic Studios and IPR.VC.

The film was in pre-production in Germany as of May 2023. In July, the production was granted a waiver to film during the 2023 SAG-AFTRA strike. On July 20, 2024, Hathaway announced that filming had wrapped.

=== Influences ===
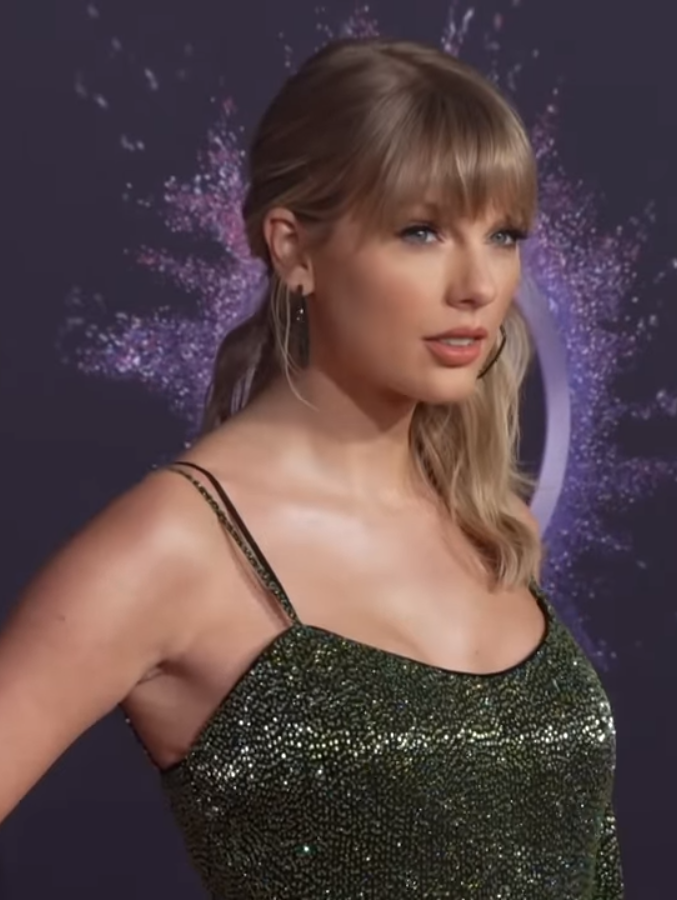
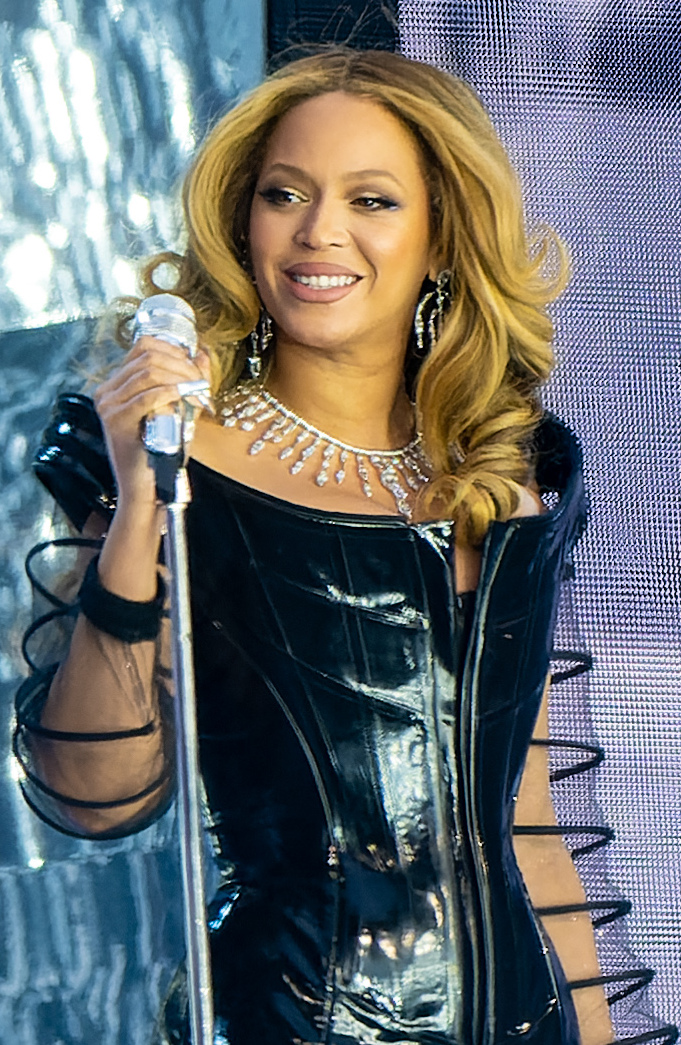
The character of Mother Mary was inspired by the singer Taylor Swift, for the direction, and Beyoncé, for Hathaway's acting performance.

Lowery said the film was partly inspired by Francis Ford Coppola's Bram Stoker's Dracula (1992). He also drew inspiration from Taylor Swift's Reputation Stadium Tour: "Her Reputation concert film is one of the best concert films ever. It's truly phenomenal. And for our concert sequences we looked at that repeatedly." Hathaway's character, Mother Mary, is Lowery's vision for what a Taylor Swift–like figure would be in the future. He added, "I definitely brought a lot of Taylor Swift to the table in terms of who Mother Mary was. I would often be like, 'Imagine Taylor Swift in ten or 15 years — that's sort of who this character could be.'"

At a press conference held in April 2026, Hathaway revealed that she had drawn inspiration from Beyoncé for her character, citing the track "American Requiem" from the singer's eighth studio album Cowboy Carter as the key to understanding how to perform her character, stating that "[Beyoncé's] technique in that song is so mesmerizing and astonishing: and listening to her phraseology, her musicianship, understanding the history of her voice that had led her to be able to make that sound that is so still, so present". Hathaway also revealed that she drew inspiration from Beyoncé's concert film and live album Homecoming.

== Music ==
Music was composed by Daniel Hart, with original songs provided by musicians Jack Antonoff and Charli XCX. FKA Twigs was also announced to provide an original song.

The soundtrack album Mother Mary: Greatest Hits was announced on March 5, 2026. It was released on April 17, 2026, via A24 Music. It includes seven original songs, all performed by Hathaway. Alongside the announcement, the lead single "Burial" was released.

== Release ==
Mother Mary was released in the United States by A24 in limited theaters on April 17, 2026, before expanding nationwide on April 24.

== Reception ==
On the review aggregator website Rotten Tomatoes, 69% of 206 critics' reviews are positive, with an average rating of 6.5/10. The website's consensus reads: "Anne Hathaway acquits herself well as a believable pop star in Mother Mary, a modish psychodrama that can be frustratingly obtuse but has style to spare." Metacritic, which uses a weighted average, assigned the film a score of 58 out of 100, based on 37 critics, indicating "mixed or average" reviews.

David Ehrlich of IndieWire gave the film an A− and wrote, "It's all rather vague and uncertain, like the contours of a rotting old friendship; the movie's surfaces are as simple as the lyrics of a pop song, and its depths as rich and boundless as the feelings that same pop song might summon." Brian Tallerico of RogerEbert.com gave the film 3 out of 4 stars and described it as "another story about the intersection of fame and art, but it's not like one you've seen before, a two-hander that owes as much to The Exorcist as it does to Lady Gaga." Kevin Maher of The Times rated the film 4 out of 5 stars, praising how "there is so much to love, even adore" about the film, starting with Hathaway.

Robbie Collin of The Telegraph rated the film 2 out of 5 stars, billing it as a "beautiful yet ungraspable psychological drama". Richard Brody of The New Yorker observed that "the result feels like a Hollywood production done on the cheap, with strenuous efforts to mask its small scale". Stephanie Zacharek of Time decried how "arty and self-conscious, [the film] is just a slog". Owen Gleiberman of Variety lamented that Mother Mary "turns into the most befuddlingly pretentious movie about a pop star since Brady Corbet's Vox Lux".
