= Lady Bertilak =

Character in Sir Gawain and the Green Knight

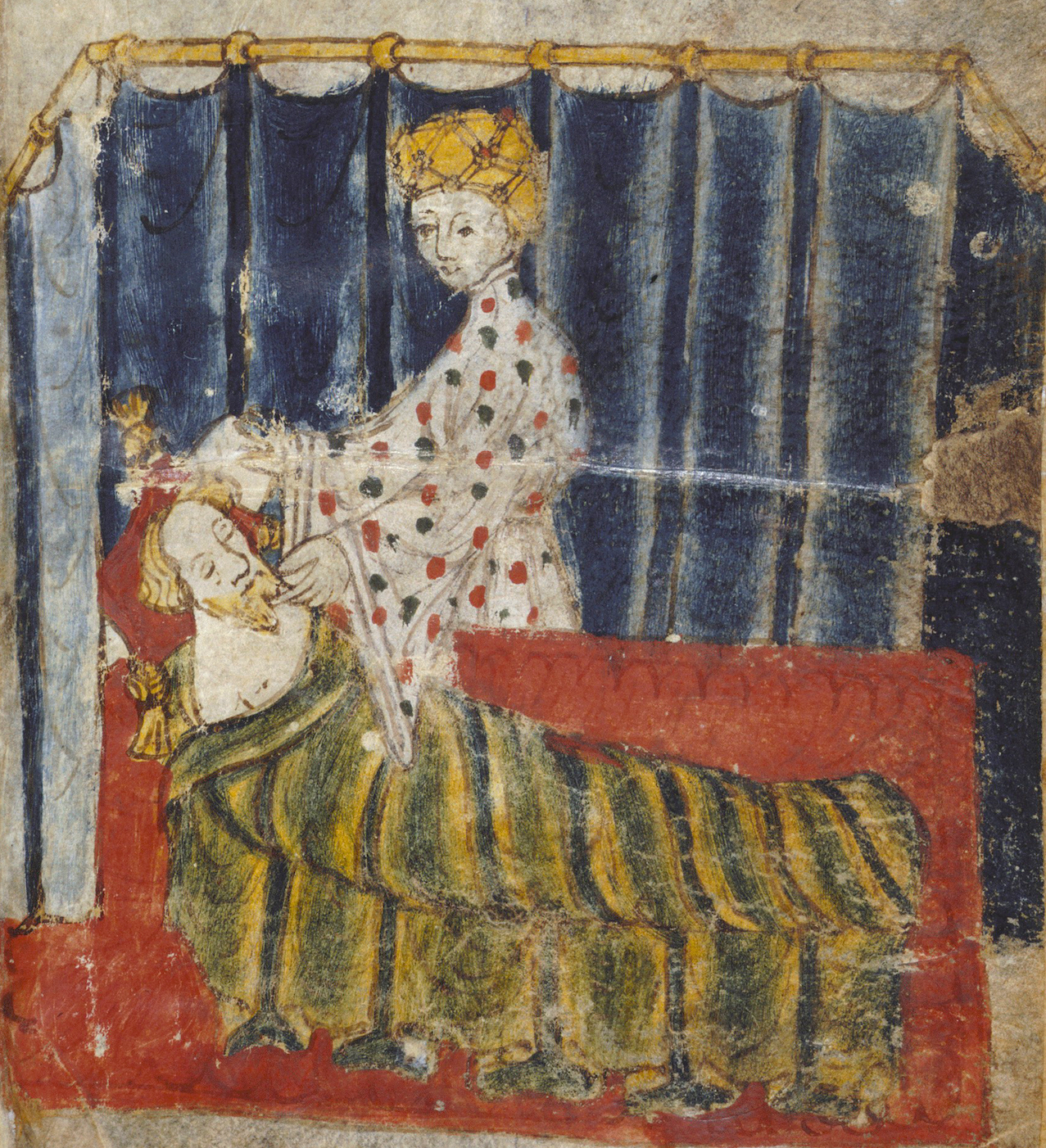
Temptation of Sir Gawain by Lady Bertilak (late 14th century illustration)

Lady Bertilak (or Lady Hautdesert) are names given by some modern critics to a character in the medieval poem Sir Gawain and the Green Knight (14th century), though the poem itself only ever calls her "the lady". She is ordered by her husband, Sir Bertilak de Hautdesert, alias the Green Knight, to test Sir Gawain's purity.

== Analysis ==
The lady of the house, Lady Hautdesert (whose actual name is never given in the poem), is one of the most prominent characters in the poem Sir Gawain and the Green Knight. In company, she always appears with a crone beside her (who later turns out to be Gawain's aunt, Morgan le Fay). The two women bracket feminine vulnerability and strength, in youth and age, and they are always together. The lord of the manor, Sir Bertilak de Hautdesert, insists that Gawain socialize freely and sit between the two women at their dinners, and Gawain finds them most hospitable.

However, she comes alone to Gawain's chambers on three mornings in a row, each time in a more alluring form, with her last appearance being in a simple gown, her hair uncovered, and without cosmetics. Each time, she comes to Gawain's bed around dawn, when Gawain is sleeping, and she plays elaborately witty games of courtship and seduction with him. She is not what would generally be expected from a lady of a household. Her “active sexual role is hardly more representative of romance heroines than of real medieval women.” Claiming one hundred and twenty two lines of speech, she plays a quintessential role in testing Sir Gawain's honour, loyalty, and most importantly his honesty through her sexual innuendoes, where she becomes “a potent threat to the exclusively masculine code of knightly behaviour.” Most interesting about these scenes is the dilemma Sir Gawain faces, where he must be courteous to Lady Bertilak (Knightly Code), and at the same time loyal to his host. The twist occurs when Sir Gawain realizes that Lady Bertilak has been used as a tool of seduction, by her husband, in order to test Sir Gawain. This betrayal leads Sir Gawain to a twenty-one line “attack of all women for their deceptiveness and treachery.” Her character proves to have an imperative role in the poem, for "a full understanding of the temptation scenes" is important for a full understanding "of the entire poem." It is also from Lady Bertilak that Gawain receives the green girdle (sash) with the power to protect its wearer "against anyone who seeks to strike him." In taking that girdle, though, Gawain betrays his deal with the lady's husband, and Gawain vows to keep the girdle forever to remind him of his sin of cowardice.

== Influence on the poem ==
Lady Bertilak's role throughout the poem is very important due to her efforts to test Sir Gawain's loyalty to Sir Bertilak de Hautdesert while staying in his home and under his rule. Lady Bertilak, along with Sir Bertilak de Hautdesert and Morgan La Fey, tests Sir Gawain's loyalty in the face of sexual advances, ones that are "not nearly as reserved and what some would call honorable" as said by Emily Spangler. Lady Bertilak approaches Sir Gawain three times during his stay, as her desires for him become more blatant and even forceful every time she stays with him. Despite Sir Gawain's attempts to remain reserved, he indulges in Lady Bertilak's advances which results in his slight injury from the Green Knight's axe later on. Lady Bertilak had succeeded in her plot, as directed by her husband, and because of the lack of malice towards him had been able to make Sir Gawain admit to his imperfections and faults in the end.

== Greed and temptation ==
In the poem Sir Gawain and the Green Knight, greed and temptation are two characteristics that guide Lady Bertilak to trick Gawain. She continuously tempts Gawain to take her belongings by telling him they will protect him. One of the most significant offerings from Lady Bertilak was the ring. Gawain easily refuses this offer even though it is protective, because of its value of wealth. Lady Bertilak schemingly makes another offer to Gawain of less value: a green girdle that has protective powers. It is here that Gawain succumbs to her offer, because of the girdle's lesser value. Lady Bertilak is aware of Gawain's promise with the lord to hand him anything he receives each day. She plays upon this promise to tempt Gawain with her offerings, because she knows he will not report it to Lord Bertilak, as he will keep the girdle for his battle with the Green Knight.

== In popular culture ==
- The character of Lady Bertilak is portrayed by the Swedish actress Alicia Vikander in the 2021 movie adaptation of The Green Knight, although her name is not given in the movie but only known as the Lady.

== Sources ==
- Cooke, Jessica (1998). "The Lady's 'Blushing' Ring in Sir Gawain and the Green Knight". The Review of English Studies. 49 (193): 1–8. JSTOR 517999.
- Spangler, Emily (Mar 2015). "Feminine Quests in Arthurian Legends" (PDF). Sparks Journal.
- Wynne-Davies, Marion (1996). Women and Arthurian Literature. New York: St. Martin's Press INC.
