= Pete's Dragon (2016 film) =

Film by David Lowery

- Theatrical release poster
- Directed by: David Lowery
- Screenplay by: David Lowery; Toby Halbrooks
- Based on: Pete's Dragon by Malcolm Marmorstein
- Produced by: Jim Whitaker
- Starring: Bryce Dallas Howard; Oakes Fegley; Wes Bentley; Karl Urban; Oona Laurence; Robert Redford
- Cinematography: Bojan Bazelli
- Edited by: Lisa Zeno Churgin
- Music by: Daniel Hart
- Production companies: Walt Disney Pictures; Whitaker Entertainment
- Distributed by: Walt Disney Studios Motion Pictures
- Release dates: August 8, 2016 (El Capitan Theatre); August 12, 2016 (United States)
- Running time: 103 minutes
- Country: United States
- Language: English
- Budget: $65 million
- Box office: $143.7 million

Pete's Dragon is a 2016 American fantasy adventure film directed by David Lowery, written by Lowery and Toby Halbrooks, and produced by James Whitaker. The film is a remake of Disney's 1977 film of the same name, although the 2016 film is not a musical. The film stars Bryce Dallas Howard, Oakes Fegley, Wes Bentley, Karl Urban, Oona Laurence, and Robert Redford. The film tells the story of an orphaned feral boy who befriends a dragon in the Pacific Northwest, and the ensuing repercussions of their discovery by the town's residents.

Pete's Dragon premiered at the El Capitan Theatre on August 8, 2016, and was theatrically released in the United States on August 12, 2016, by Walt Disney Studios Motion Pictures. The film received positive reviews from critics, and grossed $143.7 million worldwide against a $65 million production budget.

== Plot ==
In 1977, 5-year-old Pete Healy is on a road trip with his parents when their car flips over after nearly colliding with a deer. Pete's parents are killed but he survives and is pursued into the forest by a wolf pack, then saved by a large dragon with wings, green fur, and yellow eyes. Pete grows attached to the dragon and names him Elliot after a character in his favorite book.

Six years later, in 1983, Pete spots a lumberjack crew chopping down trees near his home. Natalie, the daughter of ethical site foreman Jack, spots and pursues him. When she accidentally falls from a tree, her screams attract Jack and his girlfriend, park ranger Grace Meacham. Pete tries to run away, but Gavin, Jack's ruthless brother, accidentally knocks him unconscious. After realizing that Pete has vanished, Elliot stumbles around looking for him and ends up knocking over a tree near the lumber camp, leading Gavin to organize a hunting party to find him. Meanwhile, Pete awakens in a local hospital; he escapes and tries to return to the forest.

Gavin and his men locate Pete and Elliot's treehouse, but when they try to search it, Elliot reveals himself and scares them away. He follows them to town trying to find Pete. When he sees Pete settling in with Grace's family, he leaves. Pete gives Grace a drawing of Elliot and she shows her father, Conrad, who says he discovered the same dragon as a young man. He advises her to trust Pete and find Elliot.

The next day, Pete, Grace, Natalie, and Conrad travel to the forest to meet Elliot. A group of hunters led by Gavin surprise Elliot and shoot him with tranquilizer darts, then lock him up in Jack's warehouse. Before the authorities can inspect the dragon, Pete and Natalie free him from his chains and escape on a lumber truck with Conrad.

Angered, Gavin sets up a roadblock at the bridge to stop them. When Elliot tries to fly, he crashes into the truck, damaging its brakes and it goes through the barricade. Confused and frightened, Elliot perches on top of the bridge and starts breathing fire at the lead truck driven by Grace and Jack. The bridge begins to collapse under the intense heat, causing Grace and Jack's truck to fall through, Gavin then abandons his attack and tries to save them from death. Elliot emerges from the ravine with Grace and Jack riding safely on his back. With a firefighting helicopter approaching, Pete flees with Elliot back to the woods.

Pete pleads with Elliot to let him stay so he can protect him from his attackers, just as Elliot protected him. However, Elliot concludes that as long as they stay close together, Pete will always be in danger. He points out Pete's book to encourage him to return to stay with Grace and Jack. Pete is reluctant, and worried for Elliot's safety, but ultimately trusts the dragon's judgment. After a very tearful hug, Elliot returns to the mountains and Pete returns to live with Grace and Jack as his new family.

In the years that follow, Grace and Jack marry and adopt Pete as their son. Not only has Elliot slowly faded from the town's memory, but Gavin has learned to be more scrupulous and has moved on from the experience. Pete and his family eventually go on vacation and see that Elliot is finally reunited with his fellow dragons.

== Cast ==
- Bryce Dallas Howard as Grace Meacham, a forest ranger and Jack's girlfriend later second wife.
- Oakes Fegley as Pete Healy, a young orphan who lives in the forest with a dragon named Elliot.
  - Levi Alexander as 4-year-old Pete
- Wes Bentley as Jack Magary, a widowed lumber mill owner who is Natalie's widowed father, Gavin's brother and Grace's boyfriend later husband.
- Karl Urban as Gavin Magary, a hunter and lumberjack who is Jack's brother and Natalie's uncle.
- Oona Laurence as Natalie Magary, Jack's daughter and Gavin's niece.
- Isiah Whitlock Jr. as Sheriff Gene Dentler
- Robert Redford as Conrad Meacham, Grace's widowed father who has been telling stories about the dragon.
- Marcus Henderson as Woodrow, a lumberjack and one of Gavin's men.
- Aaron Jackson as Abner, a lumberjack and one of Gavin's men.
- Phil Grieve as Bobby, a lumberjack and one of Gavin's men.
- Jim McLarty as Ranger Wentworth, a forest ranger and co-worker of Grace
- Ian Harcourt as Deputy West, a deputy who works for Sheriff Dentler
- Steve Barr as Deputy Smalls, a deputy who works for Sheriff Dentler
- John Kassir as the vocal effects for Elliott

== Production ==
In March 2013, Walt Disney Pictures announced it would remake Pete's Dragon as a non-musical, dramatic film to be written by David Lowery and Toby Halbrooks, and directed by Lowery. Disney intended to rework the core story as a dramatic story rather than a musical. The remake is set in the Pacific Northwest of the early 1980s, rather than the northern New England of the early 1900s in the 1977 film.

Live-action shots were filmed using Panavision Panaflex cameras, while Elliot the dragon was animated entirely by Weta Digital using CGI, rather than the hand-drawn animation of the 1977 original.

On September 19, 2014, Disney cast Oakes Fegley and Oona Laurence to star as Pete and Natalie. On October 2, Barrie M. Osborne was set to be the executive producer for the film. On October 16, Robert Redford was in early talks to play a local storyteller who remembers seeing a dragon in the woods. On November 20, Bryce Dallas Howard was in talks for the female lead role, a forest ranger who finds the boy and does not believe his stories about a dragon. On January 7, 2015, Wes Bentley joined the cast of the film to replace Casey Affleck. On January 9, Michael C. Hall was also added to the cast. On January 29, Karl Urban replaced Hall.

Principal photography commenced in January 2015 in New Zealand, with Lowery directing. Rehearsals began early January 2015, while news reported the beginning of the shooting on January 26, 2015, set to last through April. Live-action filming locations included Bay of Plenty, Taupō and Wellington, while CGI was done at Stone Street Studios. On February 10, 2015, a press release confirmed that principal photography had commenced. Shooting took place in and around Wellington and Rotorua, before transferring to Tapanui, where the old Blue Mountain Lumber mill was used as the mill in the film, and the main street became Millhaven for two weeks. Production concluded on April 30, 2015.

== Soundtrack ==
Academy Award-winning composer Howard Shore was originally hired to write the music for Pete's Dragon. He was replaced during post-production by Daniel Hart, who had previously worked with director Lowery on other films, most notably Ain't Them Bodies Saints (2013). The soundtrack was released on August 12, 2016, by Walt Disney Records. Though the film does not contain any songs from the original film, one song from that film, "Candle on the Water" (which was nominated for the Academy Award for Best Original Song for 1977) was recorded especially for the soundtrack album by the band Okkervil River.

== Reception ==
=== Box office ===
Pete's Dragon grossed $76.2 million in North America and $67.5 million in other territories, for a worldwide total of $143.7 million, against a budget of $65 million.

In the United States and Canada, Pete's Dragon opened on August 12, 2016, across 3,702 theaters, of which 2,884 were in 3D, and 150 were premium large-format screens, as well as in 57 D-Box and 16 Dolby Cinema sites. It was projected to gross $20–25 million in its opening weekend. The film did not have Thursday night previews, and made $7 million on its first day, Friday. In its opening weekend, it earned $21.5 million, finishing third at the box office, behind Suicide Squad and Sausage Party. The opening was reminiscent of Disney's July release The BFG, which also carried strong reviews into the weekend only to deliver $18.7 million in its first three days, and far from the $67–116 million debuts of other Disney live-action adaptations, such as Cinderella, Maleficent, Oz the Great and Powerful, The Jungle Book and Alice in Wonderland. However, many box office critics did not worry about the opening figure, given the film's modest budget, and the fact that the film is not anywhere near as well known as those films' respective source material. Disney's distribution chief Dave Hollis was optimistic that film would become profitable by saying, "People who are coming out of the theater are just loving it and their advocacy is going to help us put together a nice, solid run." Forbes noted that the film did not have any box office draws other than the stellar reviews and the notion of another Disney "live-action fairy tale." Although the film witnessed a steep decline on its second Friday (-55%), it fell just by 47.2% on its second weekend, grossing $11.3 million. On its third weekend, it fell just by 35%, grossing $7.3 million. The following weekend, Pete's Dragon declined only 14.7%, grossing $6.5 million and moved up to fourth place.

Outside North America, Pete's Dragon received a scattered release pattern. The film was released day-and-date in conjuncture with its U.S. premiere in 12 markets (roughly 30% of the overseas market), including the United Kingdom, Italy, and Russia. It earned a total of $5.3 million, with Russia ($1.5 million), Italy ($1.4 million) and the U.K. ($1.1 million) representing its largest takings. Moreover, it also opened in France ($1.8 million). It had just a 1% drop in attendance in the U.K. in its second weekend. It expanded to Germany the following weekend and continued its roll out in Australia, Mexico, Brazil and Korea throughout September, and finally Japan on December 23, 2016.

=== Critical response ===
The film was well received. Review aggregator Rotten Tomatoes gives the film an approval rating of 88% based on 246 reviews with an average rating of 7.4/10. The website's critical consensus reads, "Pete's Dragon continues Disney's current live-action winning streak with an update that gives the original a visual overhaul without overwhelming its sweet, soulful charm." On Metacritic, the film has a score of 71 out of 100, based on 42 critics, indicating "generally favorable reviews". Audiences polled by CinemaScore gave the film an average grade of "A".

Kyle Smith of The New York Post gave the film three-and-a-half out of four stars, and called it, "A cinematic enchantment" as well as, "one of the year’s best movies." Peter Travers of Rolling Stone gave the film 3 out of 4 stars and wrote, "Thanks to director David Lowery's humanizing magic, this tale of an orphan boy and a dragon is that rare family film you really can take to heart." Nancy Churnin of The Dallas Morning News gave the film a "B+" and said that while the remake, "may owe more to E.T. the Extra-Terrestrial, along with a dash of The Jungle Book than it does to the original Pete's Dragon," she overall concluded that "this story of two vulnerable souls who help each other find their way works, too." Barry Hertz of The Globe and Mail praised the film for its sincerity as well as its "honest effort to entertain and enthrall" audiences rather than simply being a cash grab.

Glenn Kenny of The New York Times felt mixed about the film in his review saying, "It is slightly unfair to say that this reboot of Pete's Dragon is middling on a larger scale, but it's not entirely inaccurate either." Michael O'Sullivan of The Washington Post gave the film two out of four stars and wrote, "While Pete's Dragon does a fine job of evoking the delight one might feel at flying over hill and dale on the back of a mythological creature, it is less successful in rendering real human emotion."

=== Accolades ===
| Award | Date of ceremony | Category | Recipient(s) | Result | Ref. |
|---|---|---|---|---|---|
| Golden Tomato Awards | January 12, 2017 | Best Kids/Family Movie 2016 | Pete's Dragon | 4th Place | |
| Heartland Film Festival | October 30, 2016 | Truly Moving Picture Award | David Lowery, Walt Disney Pictures and Walt Disney Studios Motion Pictures | Won | |
| Nickelodeon Kids' Choice Awards | March 11, 2017 | Favorite Movie | Pete's Dragon | Nominated | |
| Saturn Awards | June 28, 2017 | Best Fantasy Film | Pete's Dragon | Nominated | |

== Home media ==
Pete's Dragon was released on Blu-ray, DVD and digital download on November 29, 2016. The film topped the home video sales charts for the week ending on December 4, 2016.
