= James M. Johnston =

American film producer and director from Fort Worth, Texas

- Born: Fort Worth, Texas, U.S.
- Occupations: Film producer; film director
- Years active: 2008–present
- Known for: Ain't Them Bodies Saints (2013); A Ghost Story (2017); The Green Knight (2021)

James M. Johnston is an American film producer and director based in Fort Worth, Texas. He is a co-founder of Sailor Bear, a production company established in 2010 alongside filmmaker David Lowery and producer Toby Halbrooks. Johnston has produced several independent films, including Ain't Them Bodies Saints (2013), A Ghost Story (2017), and The Green Knight (2021). He received the Piaget Producers Award at the 2014 Film Independent Spirit Awards alongside Halbrooks. Johnston's feature directorial debut, Strawweight, starring Lupita Nyong'o and Chloë Grace Moretz, was announced in 2024.

== Career ==
Johnston co-founded the Texas-based production company Sailor Bear in 2010 with filmmaker David Lowery and producer Toby Halbrooks. Johnston was also a 2011 Creative Producing Fellow at the Sundance Institute. Sailor Bear joined commercial production company Lucky 21.

Johnston's early producing credits include Ciao (2008), a drama directed by Yen Tan and set in Dallas, and St. Nick (2009), a drama written and directed by David Lowery. In 2011, Johnston produced the short film Pioneer, written and directed by Lowery, which won the Grand Jury Prize at SXSW and at five additional film festivals. Johnston also produced Pit Stop (2013), a drama directed by Yen Tan that premiered in the NEXT section of the Sundance Film Festival.

Johnston produced Ain't Them Bodies Saints (2013), written and directed by David Lowery, which premiered in competition at the Sundance Film Festival and starred Rooney Mara, Casey Affleck, and Ben Foster. The film earned Johnston and co-producer Toby Halbrooks the Piaget Producers Award at the 2014 Film Independent Spirit Awards. Johnston continued his producing partnership with Lowery on A Ghost Story (2017), starring Casey Affleck and Rooney Mara, which premiered at the Sundance Film Festival and was released by A24.

He subsequently produced The Old Man & the Gun (2018), directed by Lowery and starring Robert Redford, with Sailor Bear's Johnston and Halbrooks among the film's producers, and The Green Knight (2021), a fantasy film written and directed by Lowery and released by A24, starring Dev Patel. Johnston served as second unit director on Peter Pan & Wendy (2023), directed by Lowery for Disney+.

=== Directorial work ===
Johnston has written and directed several short films. Receive Bacon (2009), a short comedy, was featured on the Rooftop Films blog. Knife (2011), an 11-minute wordless short about a man confronting the impact of natural gas drilling on his rural Texas community, received a grant from the Rooftop Films Filmmakers Fund and screened at SXSW, LA Shorts Fest, the Sarasota Film Festival, the Hamptons International Film Festival, and the Sidewalk Film Fest. It was also featured in Vice's "I'm Short, Not Stupid" short film series.

Melville (2015), a 15-minute short following a man recently diagnosed with lung cancer who struggles to confide in those closest to him, premiered at SXSW and won the Audience Award for Best Short Film at the Dallas International Film Festival. It was also selected as a Vimeo Staff Pick and named one of the best American short films of 2015 by IndieWire.

Johnston's feature directorial debut, Strawweight, was announced in February 2024. The film stars Lupita Nyong'o and Chloë Grace Moretz as competing UFC fighters. The screenplay was written by Paul Harrill from a story by Johnston and Harrill, and it is co-produced by Lowery and Halbrooks of Sailor Bear alongside Lars Knudsen of Square Peg and Patrick Newall. UFC champion Rose Namajunas serves as a fight consultant and executive producer.

=== Other ventures ===
Johnston co-owns Spiral Diner & Bakery, a vegan restaurant group in the Fort Worth–Dallas area, with his wife Amy McNutt. He has also been involved in the development of the Citizen Theater, a vegan art house cinema in Fort Worth.

== Filmography ==
=== As producer ===
Year	Title	Director	Notes
2008	Ciao	Yen Tan	Co-producer; set in Dallas
2009	St. Nick	David Lowery	
2011	Pioneer	David Lowery	Short film; SXSW Grand Jury Prize
2013	Pit Stop	Yen Tan	Premiered Sundance NEXT section
2013	Ain't Them Bodies Saints	David Lowery	Premiered Sundance Film Festival
2017	A Ghost Story	David Lowery	Premiered Sundance Film Festival; released by A24
2018	The Old Man & the Gun	David Lowery	
2021	The Green Knight	David Lowery	Released by A24

=== As director ===
Year	Title	Notes
2009	Receive Bacon	Short film
2011	Knife	Short film; Rooftop Films grant; SXSW selection
TBD	Merrily, Merrily	Short film
2015	Melville	Short film; SXSW premiere; Dallas IFF Audience Award
TBD	Strawweight	Feature film

=== As second unit director ===
Year	Title	Director
2023	Peter Pan & Wendy	David Lowery

== Awards ==
Year	Award	Category	Work	Result
2011	Sundance Institute	Creative Producing Fellowship	—	Won
2012	Variety	10 Producers to Watch	—	Named
2014	Film Independent Spirit Awards	Piaget Producers Award	Ain't Them Bodies Saints	Won
