= Ain't Them Bodies Saints =

- Theatrical release poster
- Directed by: David Lowery
- Written by: David Lowery
- Produced by: Cassian Elwes; Toby Halbrooks; James M. Johnston; Amy Kaufman; Lars Knudsen; Jay Van Hoy
- Starring: Casey Affleck; Rooney Mara; Ben Foster; Rami Malek; Keith Carradine; Charles Baker; Nate Parker
- Cinematography: Bradford Young
- Edited by: Craig McKay; Jane Rizzo
- Music by: Daniel Hart
- Production companies: Paradox Entertainment; Parts and Labor; The Weinstein Company
- Distributed by: IFC Films (United States); The Weinstein Company (International)
- Release dates: January 19, 2013 (Sundance); August 16, 2013 (United States)
- Running time: 97 minutes
- Country: United States
- Language: English
- Budget: $4 million
- Box office: $1 million

Ain't Them Bodies Saints is a 2013 American neo-Western romantic crime drama film written and directed by David Lowery. The film stars Casey Affleck as Bob Muldoon, Rooney Mara as Ruth Guthrie, and Ben Foster as Patrick Wheeler. Bob (Affleck) and Ruth (Mara) are a couple who become involved in criminal activities and are caught, with Bob taking the blame and going to prison. The film follows the events after the criminal activities as Ruth gives birth to their daughter, and the two live comfortably. When the child is nearly four, Bob escapes from jail and goes looking to reconnect with his family.

The film debuted at the 2013 Sundance Film Festival, where it won the Cinematography Award in the U.S. Dramatic Category and got nominated for the Grand Jury Prize. It was selected to compete in the Critics' Week section at the 2013 Cannes Film Festival. It was released on August 16, 2013, by IFC Films.

The film received positive reviews overall, with critics praising its original take on the Bonnie and Clyde archetype, and commending its style and western iconography influences. It garnered numerous critical awards and nominations and was listed in the top ten films of 2013 by many domestic and international film publications, but ultimately under-performed at the box office.

== Plot ==
Ruth Guthrie walks across a field and is followed by Bob Muldoon, who tries to dissuade Ruth from leaving him to return to her mother's. Ruth is adamant and reveals that she is angry because Bob told Freddy that he was going to 'strike out on his own'. Bob says this isn't the case. Ruth reveals she is pregnant, and they reconcile.

Later, Bob and Freddy commit a crime while Ruth waits in the getaway car. The police, including Patrick Wheeler, pursue them to a farmhouse. In the ensuing gunfight, Freddy is killed and Ruth shoots Patrick. Bob takes the fall for shooting Patrick and the crime committed earlier so Ruth can avoid jail. Bob and Ruth surrender their weapons. They are apprehended and Bob jailed. Ruth tells Skerrit, Freddy's father, that she is going to wait for Bob. Bob writes several letters from jail, promising Ruth to be back with her and their child. Ruth gives birth to their daughter, Sylvie.

Years pass. Ruth and Sylvie live a normal life in the small town of Meridian, Texas. Patrick, who does not know it was Ruth that actually shot him, notices Ruth and Sylvie around town, but Ruth avoids any contact with him. One day, Patrick makes a visit to Ruth's residence and tells her that Bob has escaped from prison. The local detective questions Ruth as to Bob's whereabouts, and Ruth tells him that Bob has not come to visit her. Meanwhile, Bob is traversing Missouri to escape the authorities. He makes it to Texas and obtains help from his friend Sweetie. Meanwhile, three bounty hunters, led by an individual called Bear, visit Skerrit's hardware store and make general inquiries about the town.

Patrick visits Ruth to return her letters the police looked over after Bob escaped. He tells her that she should move to a safer place, which Ruth takes to mean as until Bob is caught. Bob visits Skerrit at his hardware store, where Skerrit tells him there are many people who want him dead and that Bob needs to stay away from Ruth and Sylvie. Patrick visits Sweetie's establishment, asking if he has seen Bob. As they go upstairs, Bob narrowly escapes but leaves behind a photo of Ruth and Sylvie.

On the day of Sylvie's birthday party, Patrick gives Sylvie a guitar. While talking with Sylvie at the party, Patrick learns that Ruth has been planning a trip with Sylvie. Bob arrives at the house but notices Patrick and subsequently leaves. Bob returns to the original shootout location and encounters the bounty hunters. They shoot at him, and he kills one during a struggle, but he is also seriously wounded. He gets away but is chased by the third. Bob coerces a driver, Will, to drive him back to Ruth's house. Will tries to tell Bob that he should be taken to a hospital but Bob refuses, insisting to be taken to Ruth's house.

Sylvie wakes up to find her mother sleeping on the sofa in Patrick's arms. They are startled by gunshots outside. Patrick runs out to investigate and finds the third bounty hunter in a shootout with Skerrit. Patrick shoots the bounty hunter dead and finds that Skerrit is fatally wounded. Ruth and Sylvie are taken to the police station for questioning and safekeeping. When Patrick returns them to their home, they find the front door open and Patrick goes in to investigate, finding a grievously wounded Bob. Ruth follows Patrick into the house and stops Patrick from approaching Bob. Ruth tends to Bob, and Sylvie enters to see her father dying in the arms of her mother. Patrick takes Sylvie back outside and comforts her, while her parents exchange a few last words.

== Cast ==
- Rooney Mara as Ruth Guthrie
- Casey Affleck as Bob Muldoon
- Ben Foster as Patrick Wheeler
- Keith Carradine as Skerritt
- Kennadie Smith and Jacklynn Smith as Sylvie Guthrie
- Nate Parker as "Sweetie"
- Robert Longstreet as "Cowboy Hat"
- Charles Baker as "Bear"
- Augustine Frizzell as Sissy
- Kentucker Audley as Freddy
- David Zellner as Zellner
- Turner Ross as T.C.
- Rami Malek as Will
- Will Beinbrink as Lieutenant Townes
- Frank Mosley as Lieutenant Carson
- Steve Corner as Lieutenant Brule
- Annalee Jefferies as Mary
- Gwen Waymon as Margaret
- Artist Thornton as Altman

== Production ==
=== Development ===
==== Concept ====
David Lowery began writing the film in 2009 while on the festival circuit promoting his film St. Nick. At the time he was only able to think of a concept of a man breaking out of prison. What attracted him to the story was the thought of writing an action movie after having done a very quiet movie like St. Nick. However, he could not think of a compelling way to tell the story based on the concept so he left it.

==== Script ====
The tone what I wanted was there, the feeling was there, I wanted the story to be as simple as possible, as traditional, I didn't want a plot where you have to keep up with it or where you have to predict what would happen next ... I wanted the urgency to come from the tone and the feelings.

— David Lowery

Lowery revisited the concept in 2011, where he added more ideas to his original concept. His initial draft took 6 months to write, and he had planned to shoot the film immediately after writing. However, production was delayed since Lowery and his production partners submitted the script to the Sundance Institute Producing Lab, in early summer 2011. The institute encouraged Lowery to submit the script to their screenwriters lab. In December 2011, it was revealed that Sundance had selected a screenplay by David Lowery as one of 12 projects for its annual January Screenwriters Lab. Lowery worked with the Sundance Lab Artistic Director Scott Frank and his associates to develop the script.

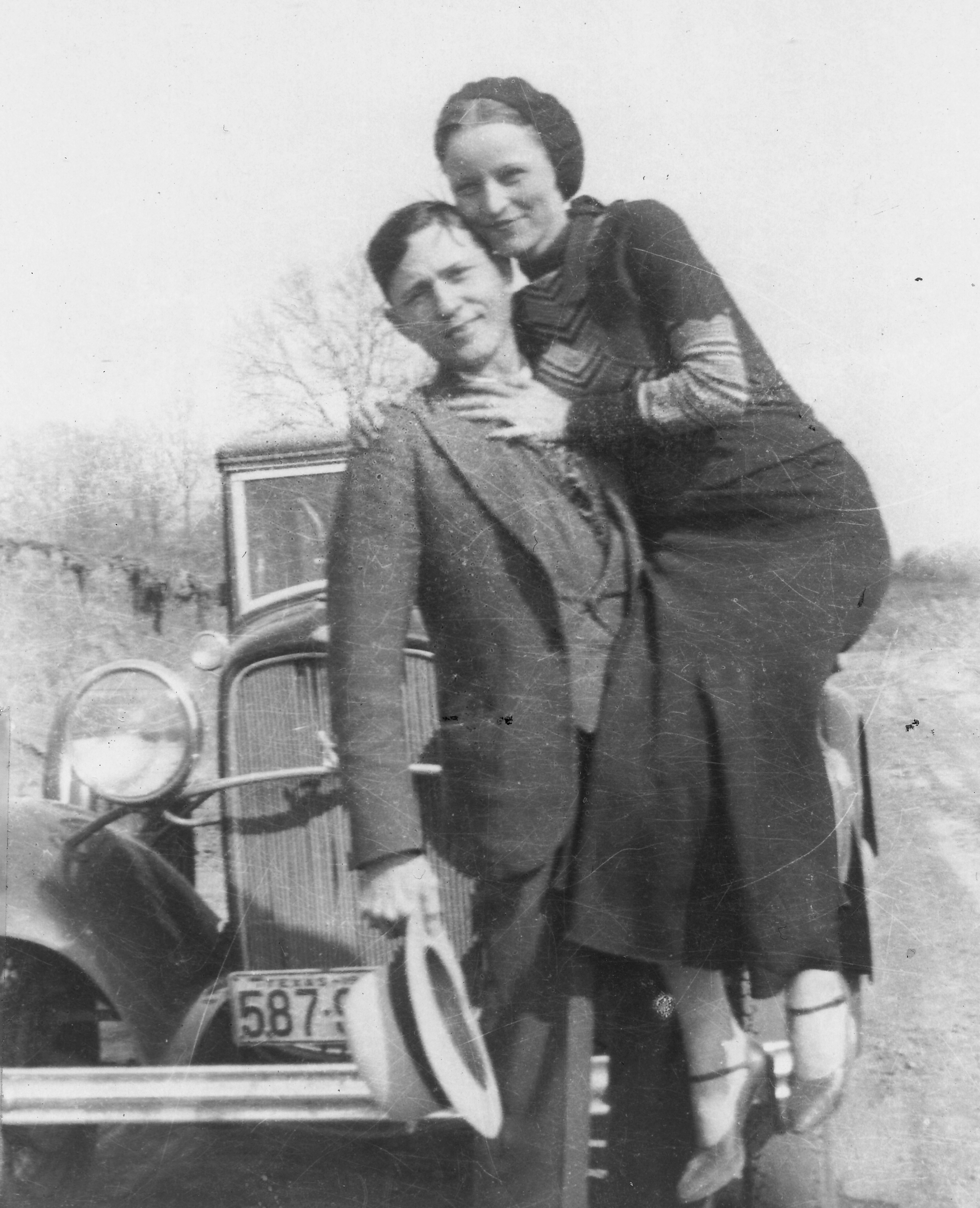
Director David Lowery took inspiration for his script from the lives of Bonnie & Clyde (pictured above)

Lowery wanted to capture the feeling of the actions and write a script based on that in the vein of 1960s and 1970s movies and folk songs. He said specifically that he wanted to "make a movie that felt like a folk song". Working on this concept, he thought about American folk mythology dealing with outlaws, developing into an outlaw who broke out of prison, then set in place the reason for the breakout being his wife and living in Texas he decided the setting would be Texas.

The script's title, which Lowery also chose to evoke the feeling of a folk song, is based on his mishearing the lyrics of a country song a friend played for him, and is unrelated to the plot or characters.

==== Financing and initial production ====
After the initial script had been written, Lowery and his producers had a start date for the production. But they were advised by producers such as Jay Van Hoy, Lars Knudsen and Amy Kaufman to aim for a bigger production, with Lowery being told "doing the micro budget version is a great plan B, and you know you can do that, but why don't you just spend a little bit of time formulating a new plan A and see if you can make it for just a little bit bigger".

In April 2012, Lowery officially announced that he had written a contemporary story in the vein of Bonnie and Clyde and that he would direct the film, named Ain't Them Bodies Saints. James Johnston, Toby Halbrooks, Amy Kaufman, Lars Knudsen and Jay Van Hoy were announced as the producers, with WME and WME Global handling representation for the film, and Evolution Independent's Cassian Elwes handling the financing of the film. Sailor Bear, Parts & Labor, Paradox Entertainment, Lagniappe Films, and Evolution Independent assumed primary production duties for the film. In July, 2012 it was confirmed that the financing structure had been finalized with Evolution Independent, Paradox Entertainment and Lagniappe.

=== Pre-production ===
==== Casting ====
My agent sent me his script, sent me his short film, and it all went on from there. David is a really talented writer and has a special, specific voice ... I felt that his short was really interesting and kind of odd, and I thought he would make an interesting movie, then I sat down with him and just hearing him talk about the film and what he wanted to do, it just felt really right.

— Rooney Mara

Casting began while Lowery was participating in the Sundance Institute Writer Lab sessions in January 2012. The script for the film was being circulated amongst various talent agencies and Lowery was being contacted by Actors and Actresses wanting to audition for the role, two of those actors being Rooney Mara and Casey Affleck. Speaking on the casting of Mara and Affleck, Lowery cited their quality of being 'timeless in their own way' as the main reason he cast them. Lowery cast Ben Foster after having met him, and noted that he felt that Ben's natural qualities were 'exactly what his character needed'.

The texture and tone of the movie was already so specific and so set in stone prior to casting, I knew what I wanted it to look like and feel like ... I was very conscientious of not casting anyone that would stick out, there are actors who I am big fans of who feel too modern, i didn't want anything in this movie to feel modern, I wanted it to feel old, and all three of those actors [Mara, Affleck, Foster] feel like they could belong there.

— David Lowery

In April, 2012 Rooney Mara, Ben Foster and Casey Affleck were announced as the principal cast for the film. In July, 2012 it was reported that Nate Parker had joined the cast of the film, with no specific details given as to his role. On 24 July 2012 it was announced that Keith Carradine had joined the cast just as principal photography began. In November, 2012 Rami Malek announced on his Facebook page that he would appear in the film as 'Will'. Malek had auditioned for the role of Sweetie, but the role went to Nate Parker, however, Lowery was so impressed with his audition tape he asked him to play a small role at the end of the film. In early December 2012 Charles Baker announced on his Twitter that he would appear in the film

It's funny when you go and meet a director and its like a blind date ... It really comes down to this kind of sixth sense that you have about the person, and i immediately felt like i trusted him ... he exudes a very generous spirit, [he is] a very intelligent guy

— Casey Affleck

Rooney Mara cited the script as the main reason for why she accepted the role, saying that it "felt right", and Casey Affleck cited his meeting with and instincts about Lowery as a director as the reason he accepted the role. Nate Parker also cited the script as the main reason he joined the cast, describing it as 'raw and emotional', but furthermore went on to state that the opportunity to work with the D.P Bradford Young was also a motivating factor.

==== Crew ====
Bradford Young joined the crew of the film after being recommended by one of Lowery's producers who had worked with Young on a film called Mother of George. Lowery familiarized himself with Young's work, describing it as "beautiful and incredibly rich and varied", and immediately set up a meeting, and proceeded to hire Young as the cinematographer for the project as a result of that meeting.

I went and met him [Bradford Young] here in New-York, and we were instantly brothers. We were finishing each others sentences, we were both vegan, that was really helpful, and we both had big beards at the time, and no hair, it was almost like we were twins immediately ... He got what I wanted to do. He got the idea of trying to make a movie that looked old, that felt old, that felt like an old-fashioned film but also wasn't relying entirely on the tricks of the past.

— David Lowery

Daniel Hart Joined the crew of the film as the composer in December 2012. This was Hart's first foray into scoring a feature film. Hart had recently worked with Lowery on his 2011 short film Pioneer, and was given the script for Aint Them Bodies Saints in December 2012. Hart cited his previous experience in providing sound for Lowery's 2009 short St.Nick and 2011's Pioneer as the reasons for him scoring Ain't Them Bodies Saints, as he felt the film was "the right fit for another collaboration".

Craig McKay, who previously edited The Silence of the Lambs and 1993's Philadelphia, joined the crew as an editor, along with Jane Rizzo, who had previously edited the critically acclaimed 2012 film Compliance. Lowery noted that this was the first time he had hired an editor.

Veteran casting director Avy Kaufman and native specialist Texas casting director Vicky Boone handled the casting of the non-main characters in the film. Production designer Jade Healy joined the crew in April 2012. Skywalker Sound handled the sound recording and management of the film.

=== Filming ===
==== Shooting and production schedule ====
Filming began on July 9, 2012, in Shreveport, Louisiana. The main reason for basing the primary filming in Louisiana was 'huge tax incentives' on offer. The rest of the scenes were filmed on location in Meridian, Texas, and Austin, Texas. The film was not shot in chronological order but rather in a sequenced manner focusing on each of the primary actors. Affleck filmed his scenes first and then shooting moved to filming the scenes in which Affleck and Mara are together, with Mara's scenes being shot last. The conditions were very hot and humid, reaching 103 degrees most days, which fit with the tone of the movie.

The actors had no traditional rehearsal times, but instead worked using an outline of the script as they filmed. Mara and Affleck did not spend much time shooting together and Mara felt it worked since it fit in with the story of the film since for most of the film Maras's and Affleck's characters do not see each other for a long period of time. Lowery encouraged a collaborative effort in regard to how his actors interpreted the script and the behavior of their characters, as long as it stayed true to their elements. Ben Foster confirmed this approach to the acting for the film, stating that "nothing was nailed down on paper" and that he had to "fill in the cracks" himself before shooting the scenes. In the scenes in which Mara acts as a mother to the two child actresses, Mara took over the direction of their scenes in order to get more authenticity into the scenes.

However, Lowery did not follow the same approach in terms of the camera angles and the shooting frames and positions he would use. Every camera angle and position was chosen and prepared beforehand. Although Lowery has professed his admiration for films that captured random shots and moments of beauty in addition to telling a narrative, he wanted this film to be one that conveyed a message with every shot and where every scene had a significant meaning. The number of takes was limited to four or five per scene.

Filming wrapped up on August 15, 2012.

==== Visual style and production design ====
The whole film was shot in F2 in order to accommodate Rooney Mara. Bradford Young later said "I hadn't shot actresses of her caliber before. But she was down. And I felt lucky that I could expose somebody like that. It's like what Harris [Savides] did with Nicole Kidman on Birth. Everyone thought it would be a disaster, but those are some of the best images ever of Kidman. And he cooked the negative way more than we did

— Bradford Young

The film was shot on 35mm film using the ARRICAM LT and Panavision XL. Most of the film was shot on Cooke S4 lenses and Low Con 1 and Low Con 2 filters in order to achieve the desired look. Cinematographer Bradford Young said he wanted to witness to the film's form take shape instead of having to make it look a certain way in post-production, and felt 35mm allowed him to add the energy of the film into the negative directly. The film does not give a time period for its setting, but reviewers have described it as seemingly dating to the 1960s or 70s.

Lowery did not want to "spoon feed" the audience who would watch the film, as he noted he despises being "spoon fed" himself. Lowery aimed to subtly let the audience know what to pay attention to using visual cues and carefully placed objects.

Lowery and Young encountered problems in acquiring their desired look due to an agreement with their bond company, who wouldn't allow extensive decay on the negative. They circumvented the problem by underexposing the film at unconventional levels, and by sliding an ND9 [filter] in front of the camera. Lowery and Young abided by a strict rule that they would only use we available light from the period of the film, and whatever sources there were, they could not vibrate; they had to burn, which narrowed them down to tungsten/incandescent lights.

We kept saying we wanted the film to look like it was shot through a bottle of bourbon or through a piece of burlap. Vilmos was doing lots of flashing and under-exposing and bleach-retention on the negative—a lot of things in the lab that I felt would be interesting if we could do on this film. We wanted to make a film look really handmade in the 21st Century, which goes back to that film question.

— Bradford Young

While working on the visual style with Young, Lowery took inspiration from movies such as Vilmos Zsigmond's work on McCabe & Mrs. Miller and Heaven's Gate, utilizing the effects used to make the images "dirty", as well as Robert Elswit's work on There Will Be Blood. To guide the darkness of the images they would use, they turned to the work of Harris Savides.

Lowery worked with Jade Healy to develop the production design for the film. He, Healy, and Young looked over archives of still photos and whittled them away to come up with a specific look and palette for the film. Healy had to also work on providing the right lighting for the period the film was in, and would subsequently bring in lamps and lamp shades, warmer or lighter, based on Lowery and Young's tastes.

=== Post-production ===
==== Editing ====
When editing, Lowery focused on what happened rather than how it happened, considering what's happening in the scene to be more important than how it happened, and choosing the cuts accordingly. Upon commencing the editing process for the film, he found that he already had 80% of the planned shots ready and in sequence but had to reconcile the other 20% that he was unsure of.

My goal when I'm editing movies I never look at the script, I just look at the footage. When I edited Upstream Color I never looked at the script but found that It was pretty much exactly what he had written. It was the same with this movie. In the editing process we started with the script, went way off course and ended back at the script. We ended up with a movie that was not very much by the numbers ... but ended up feeling pretty close to the script.

— Daniel Hart

Even so, Lowery found the editing phase of the film to be a tough process and more arduous than he had anticipated. Usually a lone editor, Lowery felt the scope of the film required additional editors, and he brought on Craig McKay and Jane Rizzo to work with him. However, he found the experience to be a negative one and stated 'If I could go back again, would I edit the movie myself? Yes I would'.

After the Sundance Film festival screening, the film was further edited upon suggestion by Harvey Weinstein, who had acquired the international distribution rights for the film. Lowery has stated that the changes were not foisted upon him, but rather he agreed with them and felt that the pre-Sundance editing process had been too rushed, and went on to say that even so, the film apparently hasn't been drastically reshaped.

==== Sound and music ====
Lowery provided the film's script to Hart in the summer of 2012 and discussed the potential soundscape and instrumentation designed for the film. He had a smaller string ensemble designed with low brass and atmospheric drones and wrote a piece for the montage sequence in which Bob goes to prison and Ruth gives birth to their baby. That piece laid the foundation for the score which resulted in the use of strings, brass, mandolin, cimbalom, droning banjo, and percussion. Curtis Heath wrote some the original songs for the score. The score album was released through Lakeshore Records on August 13, 2013.

== Distribution and release ==
=== Film festival circuit run ===
Ain't Them Bodies Saints had its premiere on the festival circuit on January 20, 2013, at the Sundance Film Festival, where it competed for the US Prizes in the Grand Jury, Audience, Screenwriting, Directing, Cinematography and Editing awards for the dramatic sections of each category. The film went on to be screened at the 2013 Cannes Film Festival during the Critics' Week selection, as well as having a special screening. On May 31, 2013, the film screened at the 2013 Seattle Film Festival. On June 15, 2013, it screened at the Los Angeles Film Festival, followed by successive showings at the BAMCinemaFest on June 19 and at the Provincetown Film Festival on June 20. The final stateside film festival screenings of the film took place on June 30, 2013, at the Nantucket Film Festival and the Maine International Film Festival on July 14, 2013.

The film then started gaining traction on the international film festival stage, having a screening at the Karlovy Vary Film Festival on July 3, 2013. The film then screened at the Munich International Film Festival and then the Jerusalem Film Festival on July 5, where it was screened as a must-see presentation. It then screened at the Deauville American Film Festival on 6 September 2013. and the Athens Film Festival on 28 September 2013. The film screened at the Amsterdam Film Week on 29 October 2013, and the Leiden International Film Festival on the 2 November 2013. The final festival showing for the film happened on November 12, 2013, at the Stockholm International Film Festival.

=== Distribution rights, marketing and theatrical run ===
On January 24, 2013, it was announced that IFC, Sony Pictures Classics, Roadside Attractions, Bob Berney's revived Picturehouse and Magnolia Pictures were in discussions for the US distribution rights. On January 25 it was announced that Cassian Elwes and WME Global's Graham Taylor and Alexis Garcia closed a deal with IFC Films' Arianna Bocco reportedly worth slightly more than $1 million for the US distribution rights. IFC confirmed on January 25 that they had acquired the North American domestic rights. It was announced that The Weinstein Company acquired the international distribution rights shortly after.

The film had its domestic limited release in the United States on August 16, 2013, opening in three theatres. At its peak it was showing at 44 theatres in the US. It had its international theatre premiere on September 5, 2013, in Israel, where the name had to be changed to Ne'ehavim mi'houtz la'hok because of translation issues, shortly followed by the UK and Ireland releases on September 6. The film was released in France on September 28 with the title Les amants du Texas, with the Greece (where again due to title issues it was changed to Meine dipla mou) and the Singapore premieres following on October 24. The Belgium premiere happened on November 6, with the Swedish and Turkish premieres taking place on November 6, where again the names were changed to A Texas Love Story (in Turkish: Ölümsüz Ask). The film had its final European premieres on 20 March 2014 and 9 May 2014 in the Netherlands and Spain (En un lugar sin ley), respectively. The film had its Japan premiere on March 29 and in Brazil (as Amor Fora da Lei) on July 10, 2014.

== Reception ==
=== Critical reception ===
The film has received mostly positive reviews, and holds a 78% "fresh" rating on Rotten Tomatoes, based on 129 reviews, attaining a score of 7.11/10. The general consensus is "While conventional in plot, Ain't Them Bodies Saints is a visually poetic film that pays homage to the New Hollywood directors of the 1970s and promises big things from director David Lowery." Metacritic gave the film a weighted average of 74 out of 100 based on 35 reviews, indicating "generally favorable" reviews.

Positive reviews of the movie commented in particular on its visual qualities. Austin Trunick of Under the Radar wrote that, "the [film's beauty] is not just in the incredible cinematography ... but in the way the film holds back information, blindsiding you with tiny revelations." Trunick gave the film a score of 9 out of 10, as did Philip Martin of the Arkansas Democrat Gazette, opining that "there are real virtues to this movie; it's remarkably well crafted and beautifully shot ... if it drifts a little too much toward romanticizing its tender outlaws, it's just following in the footsteps of the masters." In a positive review of the film, Todd Jorgenson of Cinemalogue agreed, stating that "[this] well-acted film is rich in visual texture and subtle details, and its deliberate pace rewards viewer patience." Richard Brody of The New Yorker also praised the film's visual style, maintaining that "the feel of the movie is intimate and handmade, as if Lowery were renewing, lovingly and poignantly, the landscape's ruined landmarks and infusing them with his own memories and dreams." Christy Lemire, writing for RogerEbert.com, also noted the visual style as the main strength of the film commenting, "Lowery takes his time and lets us linger over everything in the meticulously crafted frame: the thoughtful camerawork, the impeccable costume and production design," giving the film 3.5/4.

David Gritten of The Daily Telegraph gave the film a 4/5 saying "Lowery has said he wanted Ain't Them Bodies Saints to have the quality of an old folk song, something Bob Dylan might once have covered. He's succeeded – and made something affecting and stylish out of a tale with mythic aspirations." Cath Clarke of Time Out London gave the film a 4/5, commending Maras performance and saying "Bodies gets under your skin and stays there. And the gospel handclapping soundtrack feels like it's drawing you into a dream." Adam Woodward of Little White Lies focused his praise on the contributions of Bradford Young and Daniel Hart, maintaining that the film "[wears] its influences on its sleeve [without] feeling stale or derivative ... [it] is an immaculate piece of storytelling that boasts serious talent whichever way you look. Special mention must go to Bradford Young's gorgeous sun-bleached cinematography, which coupled with Daniel Hart's ubiquitous score of nervy, tiptoeing strings and soft handclaps gives the film a dream-like quality." Peter Debruge of Variety gave the film a positive review, stating that "David Lowery's Ain't Them Bodies Saints landed with the excitement of a bold new voice, and yet, there's also something undeniably old-fashioned in his approach, suggesting a lost artifact freshly unearthed from the 1970s."

Lukewarm reviews praised the ambition but questioned the execution and integrity of the film, with Peter Bradshaw of The Guardian commenting, "It's a poignant story of sundered love, earnest and intense, without being exactly tragic, and although writer-director David Lowery interestingly refuses certain romantic cliches, you wonder if he knows exactly where he's going with the narrative." The review in the Los Angeles Times was particularly critical of the narrative, stating that "[even] though Lowery is skillful with dialogue, there are ways he ties the events together that are knotty. The first is the most problematic. Though a natural fall guy is right at their feet, felled by the cops and long past complaining about issues like loyalty and betrayal, Bob grabs the gun that shot the sheriff. Lowery is intent that the couple will grapple with the idea of responsibility, whatever frustrations with logic that might pose for the rest of us." A.A. Dowd of The A.V. Club gave the film a C+, criticizing Lowery for being too eager to emulate Malick, maintaining that "upstart David Lowery mimics the mythic methodology of his revered elder, drowning the sparse tale of an on-the-run convict and his lonely baby's mama in lots of dreamy, magic-hour atmosphere."

Negative reviews focused on the film's ostensible preference of style over substance, with Slant Magazine's Nick McCarthy giving the film a score of 2.5 out of 4, pointing out that "director David Lowery, with the aide of Bradford Young's sublime cinematography, goes to great lengths to stylistically evoke the emotionally complex nature of the characters' forlornness, but the film's highly calculated beauty suffocates rather than elevates the story's emotional underpinnings." He also questioned the portrayal of motherhood in the film, accusing Mara's character of being "uninterestingly flattened into a waiting damsel in distress." In a negative review, A. O. Scott of The New York Times wrote, "Authenticity is rarely a fair standard for judging movies, which always depend on overt and invisible artifice. But this film's longing for just that quality—for a simple, elemental truth that will be both specific to its time and place and ripe with deeper meanings—is precisely what makes it unconvincing." Mick LaSalle of the San Francisco Chronicle accused the film of being self-indulgent, commenting "the tone never changes. Scenes aren't inflected, and when the end comes, it registers, but without much impact. Despite actors like these, who could have taken us anywhere and made us accept almost anything, Ain't Them Bodies Saints just drifts off into its own melancholic haze."

Critics drew extensive comparisons to the work of Terrence Malick, with Peter Bradshaw opining that "there's a mix here of early and late Malick, something of Badlands and also To the Wonder: it looks derivative, with the familiar lens flare and sunset wash. But if it is a homage, this is an intelligent and accomplished one, a conscientious matching-up of style and substance.' David Gritten also said the Malick influences worked in the film, commenting "Lowery's opening scenes could even serve as the start of an imagined sequel to Terrence Malick's 1973 classic Badlands. But Ain't Them Bodies Saints is no Malick homage. That's a relief: there are quite enough already. Indeed, far from dwelling on transcendence, as Malick does, Lowery's film has a solid, grounded storyline, rooted in crime thrillers and film noir tradition." Lemire also compared him to Malick, in a positive vein, writing that "the comparisons to Terrence Malick are obvious and many—and a well-deserved compliment—for David Lowery's drama Ain't Them Bodies Saints. The setting of 1970s Texas, the impressionistic wisps of memory, the quiet naturalism of warm sunlight and the dusky magic-hour melancholy—they're all there, all those signatures that are reminiscent of the master filmmaker." Some critics were less positively inclined towards the film's intimations of Malick's artistry, with Antonia Quirke of the Financial Times writing that "there is a completely numbing sense that this really is a lost Terrence Malick - that this was done a long time ago, and that cinema's cupboards are empty and there is no new stuff to make in a new way." A. A. Dowd maintained that "Even Malick's lesser works, like this spring's To The Wonder, add up to more than the sum of their lyrical parts. They have big ideas, bigger emotions, and a sense of dramatic urgency—all qualities fatally absent from this well-shot but bloodless crime fable. Lowery, it can't be denied, has Malick's moves down pat. It's the Malick touch that eludes him."

=== Box office reception ===
Ain't Them Bodies Saints had its US domestic opening on the weekend of 16–18 August 2013 in 3 theatres, where it made $26,419, ranking at number 58 in the Box office charts. At the end of week ending 22 August the film made $40,921, ending 59th on the box office charts. The second week of the film saw a drastic improvement in commercial reception, recording a 147% increase in weekend box office growth of $65,175, ending the week with a 144% overall increase from the opening week, recording a box office return for the week ending 29 August of $100,005, bringing its total theatrical run to $140,926 from 28 theatres and marking its highest domestic box office ranking of 43. The film continued its improving theatrical performance in its third week by opening in 12 extra theatres to make the total 40 theatres, recording $109,209 in box office revenue, an increase of 9.2% on the previous week, bringing the total to $250,135. in the month of September the film commercial performance started to lag, recording less than $140,000 for the month. The domestic theatric run for the film ended on October 3, with total domestic returns of $396,519.

The film's UK opening recorded a $82,190 return, and over the two and half weeks of its theatrical run in the UK it recorded a $192,834 return in total. The film's second largest international returns came in France with $112,671, with the third best performing international territory being Belgium with a return of $33,391. In total the film made $634,724, almost twice its domestic performance.

Ain't Them Bodies Saints ended its theatrical run having accumulated $1,031,243 in box office receipts. With a budget of close to $4 million, the film was a box office disappointment.

=== Awards ===
Award	Date of ceremony	Category	Recipients and nominees	Result
National Board of Review	January 7, 2014	Top Ten Independent Films 2013	David Lowery	Won
Gotham Awards	December 2, 2013	Best Feature	David Lowery (director), Toby Halbrooks (producer), James M. Johnston (producer), Jay Van Hoy (producer), Lars Knudsen (producer), Amy Kaufman (producer)	Nominated
Sundance Film Festival	January 26, 2013	Special Jury Prize: Cinematography	Bradford Young	Won
Sundance Film Festival	January 26, 2013	Indian Paintbrush Producer's Award	James M. Johnston, Toby Halbrooks, Sailor Bear	Won
Sundance Film Festival	January 26, 2013	Grand Jury Prize: U.S. Dramatic	David Lowery	Nominated
Black Reel Awards	February 7, 2013	Outstanding Supporting Actor, Motion Picture	Nate Parker	Nominated
Deauville Film Festival	6 August 2013	Grand Special Prize	David Lowery	Nominated
Munich Film Festival	10 June 2013	Best International Film	David Lowery	Nominated
Palm Springs International Film Festival	January 6, 2013	Directors To Watch	David Lowery	Nominated
Deauville Film Festival	September 6, 2013	Grand Special Prize	David Lowery	Nominated
Dublin Film Critics' Circle	December 18, 2013	Best Actress	Rooney Mara	Nominated
Ghent International Film Festival	October 14, 2013	Grand Prix	David Lowery	Nominated
Seattle International Film Festival	May 31, 2013	Best Actor	Casey Affleck	Nominated
St. Louis Gateway Film Critics Association Awards 2013	December 9, 2013	Best Artistic/Creative Film (for excellence in art-house cinema)	David Lowery	Nominated
