= Blood on the Highway =

- Theatrical poster
- Directed by: Barak Epstein; Blair Rowan
- Written by: Chris Gardner; Blair Rowan
- Produced by: Barak Epstein; Robert Bell; Judah Epstein; Chris Scruggs
- Starring: Deva George; Robin Gierhart; Nate Rubin; Tony Medlin
- Cinematography: Clay Liford
- Edited by: Michael Fleetwood
- Music by: Paul Nichols
- Distributed by: BOH Productions
- Release date: March 28, 2008 (AFI Dallas Film Festival)
- Country: United States
- Language: English

Blood on the Highway is an American comedy horror film that was first released in March 2008 by BOH Productions. The film premiered at the AFI Dallas Film Festival on March 28, 2008. The film was directed by Barak Epstein and Blair Rowan and stars Deva George, Robin Gierhart, Nate Rubin, and features Nicholas Brendon and Tom Towles (his final film role who retired from acting before his death on April 2, 2015). The screenplay to the film, is an homage/parody to horror films, was written by Chris Gardner and Blair Rowan.

== Plot ==
The populace of the lethargic small town Fate, TX gathers for the grand opening of Consumart, a glossy new one-stop-shopping box store. The enthusiastic patrons merrily dispense into the store as the doors open at sunset. Before the unsuspecting shoppers have time to question the fact that the store is stocked with coffins, terror erupts and the store explodes into a bloodbath. A few weeks later, three unmindful, egocentric twenty somethings, Carrie (Robin Gierhart), Sam (Nate Rubin), and Bone (Deva George), embark on a road trip to Mr. Fire, a festival which shares eerie similarities to Burning Man, and accidentally wander into Fate, unaware of its population's ill-fated transformation... into vampires. Carrie, a superficial, aggressive scenester is dating Sam's wallet. Sam is a shrill, immature, hypochondriac, well-to-do young man. Bone, an uncaring badass with a malicious speech pattern, is still nurturing a yearning for Carrie predicated upon a drunken, frolicsome one night stand.

After a confrontation with two blood-thirsty convenience store clerks in which Sam is repeatedly bitten and attacked, Bone is forced to butcher them. Now the protagonists begin to wonder if something strange might be going on in the town. Luckily, but only in the sense that they didn't get murdered, the three stumble upon the only surviving humans in town: Byron Von Jones (Tony Medlin), a trigger-happy, conspiracy theorist, militia member; Lynette Von Jones (Laura Stone), a worn, white-trash hussy; and Roy Jackson (Chris Gardner), a spineless, deceitful frat boy in his early 20s. The group is forced to band together and take shelter in Roy's ranch house, surrounded by hundreds of vampires intending to torch the property before sunrise. The group must now try to last throughout the night with their bloodthirsty pursuers on their tail.

== Cast ==
- Deva George as Bone
- Robin Gierhart as Carrie
- Nate Rubin as Sam
- Tony Medlin as Byron
- Laura Stone as Lynette
- Linda Ngo as Vampire
- Chris Gardner as Roy
- Tom Towles as Louis Debois
- Nicholas Brendon as Chase Sinclair
- Richard Olsen as Old Zeke

== Reception ==
Philip Martin, writing for the Arkansas Democrat-Gazette, called it a "Cheesy self aware horror movie chockfull of gory gags and sex jokes, a few of which click. May find a home with cultists looking to adopt." Adrian Halen, writing for Horror News, said, "This is a film I’ll watch again and again for years to come! I think this release will find its way on to many film viewers cult movies shelf."
