= A Ghost Story =

- Theatrical release poster
- Directed by: David Lowery
- Written by: David Lowery
- Produced by: Toby Halbrooks; James M. Johnston; Adam Donaghey
- Starring: Casey Affleck; Rooney Mara; Will Oldham; Liz Cardenas Franke; Sonia Acevedo; Rob Zabrecky
- Cinematography: Andrew Droz Palermo
- Edited by: David Lowery
- Music by: Daniel Hart
- Production companies: Sailor Bear; Zero Trans Fat Productions; Ideaman Studios; Scared Sheetless
- Distributed by: A24
- Release dates: January 22, 2017 (Sundance); July 7, 2017 (United States)
- Running time: 92 minutes
- Country: United States
- Languages: English; Spanish
- Budget: $100,000
- Box office: $2 million

A Ghost Story is a 2017 American supernatural drama film written and directed by David Lowery and starring Casey Affleck, Rooney Mara, and Will Oldham. It is about a man who becomes a ghost and remains in the house he shared with his wife.

The film had its world premiere at the Sundance Film Festival on January 22, 2017, and was released by A24 in the United States on July 7, 2017. It received acclaim from critics.

== Plot ==
A woman (credited as "M") mentions to her musician husband (credited as "C") that as a child, she moved residences frequently and took to hiding little notes wherever she lived. C is resistant to M's desire to move, creating tension within their relationship. When he finally accepts, they hear a loud bang while asleep, the source of which they are unable to identify.

Shortly afterwards, C is killed in a car accident nearby. At the hospital, M covers his body with a sheet before departing. C awakens as a ghost, invisible to the living. Still covered with the sheet, he wanders through the hospital. A door of light opens in front of him, but he makes no attempt to approach it and it closes.

C walks home and sees Linda, her landlady, drop off a pie. M arrives and eats the pie until she vomits. Unable to communicate with her, C watches M grieve before proceeding with her life. In the house next door, he sees another ghost covered by a flower-print sheet who says that it is waiting for someone, though it does not remember who.

Upon discovering that M is dating another man (credited as "Gentleman Caller"), C jealously creates disturbances inside the house. Books fall from a shelf, and M finds one lying open at the story "A Haunted House" by Virginia Woolf, which tells of a ghostly couple whose love lingers beyond death. Later, M listens to one of C's songs and recalls the first time he played it for her. She moves away, but first writes a note and hides it in a gap between some molding, which she paints over. C picks at the paint but is unable to reach the note.

Later, a Spanish-speaking single mother moves into the house with her young son and daughter. C watches them eat, play the piano and celebrate Christmas. The children begin to sense his presence and become frightened. One night, he knocks a framed photo of the family off the piano and smashes dishes in the kitchen. The family moves out and the ghost continues scraping at the paint.

At a party thrown by the next occupants, a woman says she has stopped working on her novel and a man responds by claiming all creative pursuits are pointless, as the universe will eventually end. The partygoers notice the lights flicker.

The house is abandoned and becomes derelict. C's efforts to retrieve the note are interrupted by a bulldozer crashing through a wall. The house next door is also torn down; the flower-print ghost, while standing amongst the ruins, says "I don’t think they’re coming" and disappears from beneath its sheet. A skyscraper is built where the house was; once it is finished, C views a futuristic cityscape from the balcony before jumping off the ledge.

The celestial sphere rotates in reverse, and C finds himself in a field in the 19th century with a man who is driving stakes into the ground. The man's wife and three daughters arrive in a covered wagon, and the family prepares to build a house. The youngest daughter writes a note and hides it under a rock while humming the tune of C's song. Native Americans attack and kill the family, and C watches the girl's corpse decay.

Back in the house, which is empty except for the piano, C sees himself and M enter and look around. His life in the house repeats itself; he witnesses their last argument, and upon hearing his past self finally give in, he sits down heavily at the piano, creating the bang that had earlier startled the couple. Later, C watches his earlier ghost-self watch M leave the house for the last time. He finally retrieves the note and, upon reading it, disappears, his empty sheet collapsing to the floor.

== Cast ==
- Casey Affleck as C
- Rooney Mara as M
- Kenneisha Thompson as Doctor
- Liz Cardenas Franke as Linda
- Barlow Jacobs as Gentleman Caller
- Sonia Acevedo as Maria
- Carlos Bermudez as Carlos
- Yasmina Gutierrez as Yasmina
- Kesha Sebert as Spirit Girl
- Jared Kopf as Magician
- Will Oldham as Prognosticator
- Brea Grant as Clara
- Augustine Frizzell as Clara's Wife Who is Writing a Book
- Jonny Mars as Oversharing Man
- Rob Zabrecky as Pioneer Man
- Sara Tomerlin as Pioneer Woman
- Margot Tomerlin as Pioneer Child
- Sylvie Tomerlin as Pioneer Child
- Savanna Walsh as Pioneer Child

== Production ==
=== Development ===
David Lowery had wanted to make a film featuring a man in a rudimentary ghost costume "for a while", telling Comingsoon.net: "I just loved that image. I love taking something that is understood to be funny or charming or sweet or naive and instilling it with some degree of gravity." When he and his wife got in an argument about moving back to Texas, he began to write down the argument "thinking about my own attachment to physical spaces." After he thought to combine this with the idea about the ghost costume, he came up with the basic concept for the movie fairly quickly and began to write the screenplay in the spring of 2016. Lowery also used the film to work through what he termed "An existential crisis" brought on by reading an article about the possibility of a catastrophic earthquake, saying: "I was not feeling optimistic about the future of mankind. I felt the world was on its way to ending. The film became my way of dealing with those issues." The film's atypical 1.33:1 aspect ratio was chosen by Lowery partially because he thought it was thematically appropriate: "It’s about someone basically trapped in a box for eternity, and I felt the claustrophobia of that situation could be amplified by the boxiness of the aspect ratio."

The ghost costume that was ultimately designed for the film ended up being more complicated than Lowery had anticipated. At first, the filmmakers attempted to simply use a normal bed sheet, but they found that even a king-sized sheet does not fully cover an adult male. The final costume required Affleck to wear certain other garments beneath the fabric to achieve the desired look, and the filmmakers found they had to resort to some "puppeteering" to keep the eyes in place. Beyond the practical constraints of the costume, Lowery also found that it impeded Affleck's ability to act, noting: "every unique physical trait as a human being was pronounced and exaggerated by this sheet over his head." This did not give Lowery the results he wanted, and he eventually solved the problem by reducing the amount Affleck moved, so "it became a matter of patience and posture and moving very specifically, slowly and rigidly."

=== Filming ===
Principal photography began in June 2016. The majority of the film takes place within a single house, which was chosen by Lowery because it closely resembled the first house he lived in with his wife. As the house was about to be demolished, the film crew was allowed to use it for free. Some shots of the ghost, specifically those done during pickups or reshoots, do not feature Affleck, instead replacing him with the film's art director, David Pink, who was found to have a similar build.

As the filmmakers did not know how the final product would turn out, the film was shot in secret and not officially announced until November 2016, at which point it was confirmed that Mara and Affleck were the leads. It was later revealed that Kesha would appear in the film in a cameo role.

=== Music ===
Daniel Hart composed the score for the film, as he had for all of Lowery's previous features and one short film. A soundtrack of the score was released by Milan Records on July 7, 2017.

== Release ==
Prior to the film's world premiere at the Sundance Film Festival on January 22, 2017, A24 acquired its worldwide distribution rights. The company released the film in the United States on July 7, 2017.

== Reception ==
=== Box office ===
The film earned $104,030 from four theaters during its opening weekend (an average per-location gross of $26,008), finishing in 26th place at the American box office. By the end of its theatrical run, it had grossed $1,596,371 domestically and $355,312 internationally, for a worldwide total of just under $2 million.

=== Critical response ===
On the review aggregator website Rotten Tomatoes, 91% of 285 critics' reviews are positive, with an average rating of 8/10. The website's consensus reads: "A Ghost Story deftly manages its ambitious themes through an inventive, artful, and ultimately poignant exploration of love and loss." Metacritic, which uses a weighted average, assigned the film a score of 84 out of 100, based on 46 critics, indicating "universal acclaim".

Peter Debruge of Variety gave the film a positive review, writing: "While Lowery's actual method of delivery may not be scary, it's sure to haunt those who open themselves up to the experience." David Rooney of The Hollywood Reporter also gave the film a positive review, writing: "A poetic meditation on time, memory and spiritual connection that is utterly true to its title." Eric Kohn of IndieWire gave the film an "A" rating, calling it "an extraordinary mood piece that amounts to [Lowery's] best movie yet." Gary Thompson of the Philadelphia Inquirer gave the film two and a half stars out of four and wrote: "The movie is trippy and almost willfully opaque—all I can say for sure is I left A Ghost Story feeling full."

Richard Brody, writing for The New Yorker, included A Ghost Story in his list of the 27 best films of the decade.

=== Accolades ===
On September 9, 2017, the film won three awards at the 43rd Deauville American Film Festival: the Revelation Prize, the Critics Prize and the Jury Prize; additionally, David Lowery was nominated for the Grand Special Prize. On October 14, the film won two awards at the Sitges Film Festival: Best Photography and the Carnet Jove Jury Award. At the Fantasia Film Festival, the film won the Camera Lucida Award.

Award	Date of ceremony	Category	Recipient(s) and nominee(s)	Result	Ref(s)
Boston Society of Film Critics	December 10, 2017	Best Film Editing	David Lowery	Won	
Deauville Film Festival	September 9, 2017	Revelation Prize	David Lowery	Won	
Deauville Film Festival	September 9, 2017	Critics Prize	David Lowery	Won	
Deauville Film Festival	September 9, 2017	Jury Prize	David Lowery	Won	
Deauville Film Festival	September 9, 2017	Grand Special Prize	David Lowery	Nominated	
Fantasia Film Festival	August 3, 2017	Camera Lucida Award	David Lowery	Won	
Georgia Film Critics Association	January 12, 2018	Best Film	A Ghost Story	Nominated	
Georgia Film Critics Association	January 12, 2018	Best Original Song	"I Get Overwhelmed"	Nominated	
Houston Film Critics Society	January 6, 2018	Best Original Song	"I Get Overwhelmed"	Nominated	
Houston Film Critics Society	January 6, 2018	Texas Independent Film Award	A Ghost Story	Won	
Independent Spirit Awards	March 3, 2018	John Cassavetes Award	A Ghost Story	Nominated	
National Board of Review	January 4, 2018	Top Ten Independent Films	A Ghost Story	Won	
Online Film Critics Society	December 28, 2017	Best Picture	A Ghost Story	Nominated	
Sitges Film Festival	October 14, 2017	Best Cinematography	Andrew Droz Palermo	Won	
Sitges Film Festival	October 14, 2017	Carnet Jove Jury Award	David Lowery	Won	
Sundance Film Festival	January 22, 2018	Audience Award	David Lowery	Nominated	
