= David Lowery (director) =

American filmmaker

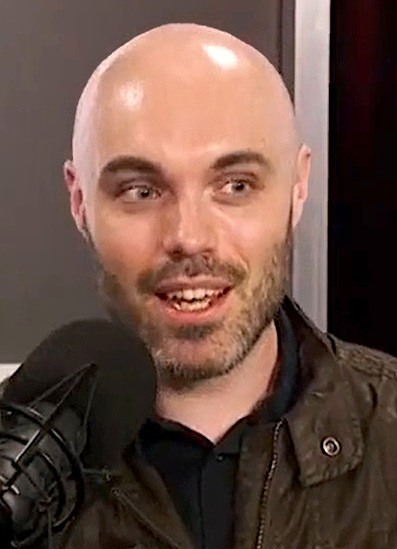
- Lowery in 2018
- Born: December 26, 1980 (age 45); Milwaukee, Wisconsin, U.S.
- Occupations: Filmmaker, actor
- Years active: 2000–present
- Spouse: Augustine Frizzell (m. 2010)

David Lowery (born December 26, 1980) is an American filmmaker. His film Ain't Them Bodies Saints (2013), starring Rooney Mara and Casey Affleck, was nominated for the Grand Jury Prize at the 2013 Sundance Film Festival. In 2016, he directed the Disney film Pete's Dragon (2016), a live-action film which he had co-written, loosely based on the same original story as the Disney 1977 musical of the same name. He directed the drama film A Ghost Story (2017), the crime film The Old Man & the Gun (2018), the fantasy epic The Green Knight (2021) and the musical psychological drama Mother Mary (2026).

== Early life ==
Born in Milwaukee, Wisconsin, on December 26, 1980, David Lowery is the eldest of nine children born to Madeleine and Mark Lowery. When he was seven, his family moved to Irving, Texas, for his father's work. Lowery attended Irving High School.

At the age of 19, Lowery wrote and directed his first film, a short entitled Lullaby.

== Career ==
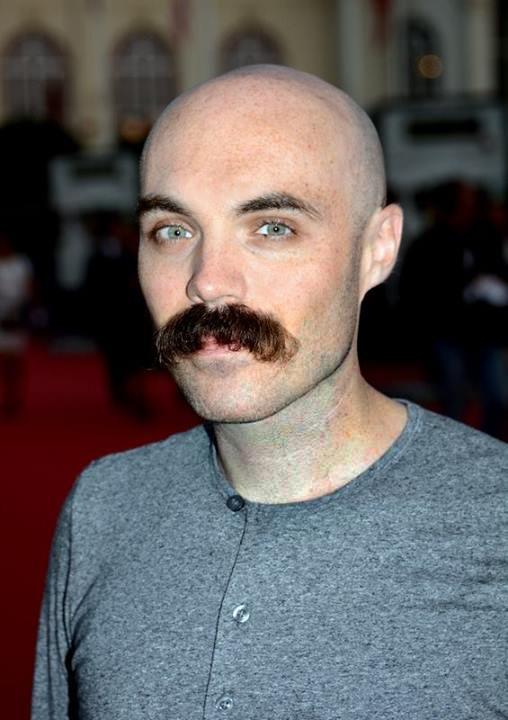
Lowery at the Deauville Film Festival, 2013

Lowery's first feature film, St. Nick, which follows two runaway children abandoned by their guardians, premiered at the 2009 South by Southwest festival. It won the Texas Filmmaker Award at the 2009 AFI Dallas International Film Festival.

In 2011, Lowery started his own production company, Sailor Bear. That same year, he wrote and directed the short film entitled Pioneer, which played at the Sundance Film Festival that year.

In 2013, Lowery wrote, directed and edited his second feature film, Ain't Them Bodies Saints, starring Casey Affleck and Rooney Mara. The film was nominated for the Grand Jury Prize at the 2013 Sundance Film Festival. It was selected to compete at the Critics' Week section of the 2013 Cannes Film Festival. Lowery has said that he drew from great directors and their works for this film, citing Claire Denis's 35 Shots of Rum, Robert Altman's McCabe & Mrs. Miller, and Paul Thomas Anderson and David Fincher as influences.

In addition to having edited films such as Amy Seimetz's Sun Don't Shine and Shane Carruth's Upstream Color, Lowery co-wrote Pit Stop with director Yen Tan. At the 2014 Cannes Film Festival, it was announced that Lowery would write and direct the film adaptation of the novel The Yellow Birds, written by Iraq War veteran Kevin Powers; it was a 2012 National Book Award finalist. The film was eventually directed by Alexandre Moors and stars Jack Huston, Tye Sheridan, Alden Ehrenreich and Jennifer Aniston.

In April 2016, Lowery directed a remake of Disney's Pete's Dragon, which was met with positive reviews. Lowery also co-wrote the screenplay alongside Toby Halbrooks. In July 2016, it was announced Lowery would direct an episode of Breakthrough for National Geographic Channel. In November 2016, it was announced Lowery had shot a new film, A Ghost Story, over the summer with Rooney Mara and Casey Affleck as a secret project.

Lowery next directed the 2018 drama film The Old Man & the Gun, starring Robert Redford as bank robber, Forrest Tucker, and Casey Affleck.

=== 2020s ===
Lowery followed up The Old Man and the Gun with the medieval fantasy The Green Knight which stars Dev Patel, Alicia Vikander, Joel Edgerton, Barry Keoghan, Ralph Ineson and Sean Harris. The film was scheduled to world premiere at South by Southwest in March 2020, and be released on May 29, 2020, but the premiere and release were cancelled due to the COVID-19 pandemic. It was released on July 30, 2021.

Lowery directed a segment of the anthology film The Year of the Everlasting Storm which premiered at the Cannes Film Festival in July 2021 and was released in theatres on 3 September 2021.

After working with Disney on Pete's Dragon, Lowery signed on to direct a live-action adaptation of their 1953 animated film Peter Pan in April 2016. The film, titled Peter Pan & Wendy and starring Alexander Molony as Peter Pan, Jude Law as Captain Hook, and Ever Anderson as Wendy Darling, was released on Disney+ on April 28, 2023.

In March 2023, it was announced Lowery would write and direct the music drama film Mother Mary for A24, with Anne Hathaway and Michaela Coel starring and Jack Antonoff and Charli XCX writing original songs for the project.

In July 2026, it was announced that Lowery would direct and co-write a feature adaptation of John Langan's Lovecraftian novel, The Fisherman, for Focus Features.

== Personal life ==
Lowery married filmmaker Augustine Frizzell in 2010. As of 2013, they live in Dallas. Lowery identifies as an atheist, and has been a vegan since approximately 1996.

== Filmography ==
=== Film ===
Year	Title	Director	Writer	Editor	Producer
2005	Deadroom	Yes	Yes	Yes	Yes
2009	It Was Great, But I Was Ready to Come Home	No	Yes	No	No
2009	St. Nick	Yes	Yes	Yes	No
2013	Ain't Them Bodies Saints	Yes	Yes	No	No
2013	Pit Stop	No	Yes	No	No
2016	Pete's Dragon	Yes	Yes	No	No
2017	A Ghost Story	Yes	Yes	Yes	No
2017	The Yellow Birds	No	Yes	No	No
2018	The Old Man & the Gun	Yes	Yes	No	No
2021	The Green Knight	Yes	Yes	Yes	Yes
2023	Peter Pan & Wendy	Yes	Yes	No	No
2026	Mother Mary	Yes	Yes	Yes	Yes

Executive producer

- Minor Setback (2013)
- Person to Person (2017)
- Never Goin' Back (2018)
- Light from Light (2019)
- Miss Juneteenth (2020)
- We're All Going to the World's Fair (2022)

Short films

Year	Title	Director	Writer	Producer	Editor	DoP	Notes
2000	Lullaby	Yes	Yes	Yes	Yes	Yes	Also camera operator
2000	The Knocker	No	No	No	Yes	Yes	
2003	Still	Yes	Yes	Executive	Yes	No	
2003	Looking for Love	Yes	Yes	No	Yes	Yes	
2006	G.D.M.F.	No	No	Yes	Yes	Yes	
2006	Some Analog Lines	Yes	Yes	Yes	Yes	No	
2007	The Outlaw Son	Yes	Yes	No	No	No	
2008	A Catalog of Anticipations	Yes	Yes	No	No	No	
2008	Coda	No	No	Yes	Yes	Yes	
2008	Merrily, Merrily	No	Yes	No	Yes	No	
2009	The Crane House	No	No	No	Yes	Yes	
2009	Boycrazy Promo	Yes	No	Executive	Yes	Yes	
2009	Boycrazy in Bed	Yes	No	Executive	Yes	Yes	
2009	Boycrazy Gets a Job	Yes	No	Executive	Yes	Yes	
2009	Boycrazy Bikini Mishap	Yes	No	Executive	Yes	Yes	
2009	Boycrazy at the Drug Store	Yes	No	Executive	Yes	Yes	
2011	Pioneer	Yes	Yes	No	Yes	No	
2011	My Daily Routine	Yes	No	No	No	No	Documentary short
2014	Until We Could	Yes	Yes	No	No	No	
2021	Dig Up My Darling	Yes	Yes	No	No	No	Segment of The Year of the Everlasting Storm
2022	Oak Thorn & The Old Rose Of Love	Yes	Yes	Yes	Yes	No	
2024	An Almost Christmas Story	Yes	Yes	Yes	No	No	

Additional credits

Year	Title	Role
2008	Blood on the Highway	Second unit director and assistant camera
2008	Ciao	Editor and co-producer
2009	Alexander the Last	Additional editor and sound recordist
2009	St. Nick	Editor
2010	Lovers of Hate	Cinematographer
2010	Audrey the Trainwreck	Cinematographer
2010	Shadowboxing	Editor
2011	Bad Fever	Editor
2011	Uncertain, TX	Editor
2011	Universal Squadrons	Editor
2012	Sun Don't Shine	Editor
2012	Reconvergence	Cinematographer
2012	Nor'easter	Editor
2013	Upstream Color	Editor
2014	Listen Up Philip	Producer
2014	Empire Builder	Editor and cinematographer

Acting roles

Year	Title	Role	Notes
2002	Happy Birthday	Videographer	
2008	Blood on the Highway	Vampire	
2009	Alexander the Last	Stagehand	
2017	A Ghost Story	Neighbor's Ghost	Uncredited
2022	Lynch/Oz	Narrator/Contributor	Chapter 6: Dig
2024	Queer	Jim Cochan	
2024	An Almost Christmas Story	Additional voices	Short film

=== Television ===
Year	Title	Director	Executive producer	Writer	Episode(s)
2014	Rectify	Yes	No	No	"Donald the Normal"
2017	Breakthrough	Yes	No	No	"Addiction: A Psychedelic Cure?"
2018	Strange Angel	Yes	Yes	No	"Augurs of Spring" and "Ritual of Abduction"
2021	Cinema Toast	Yes	No	Yes	"The Gunshot Heard 'Round the World"
2024	Star Wars: Skeleton Crew	Yes	No	No	"Way, Way Out Past the Barrier" and "Very Interesting, As An Astrogation Problem"

== Accolades ==
Year	Award	Category	Work	Result
2005	Texas Film Festival	Best Feature Narrative	Deadroom	Won
2008	SXSW Film Festival	Grand Jury Award	A Catalog of Anticipations	Nominated
2009	Dallas International Film Festival	Grand Jury Prize	St. Nick	Won
2009	Sidewalk Film Festival	Special Jury Award	St. Nick	Won
2009	St. Louis International Film Festival	New Filmmakers Forum Award	St. Nick	Won
2009	Thessaloniki Film Festival	Golden Alexander	St. Nick	Nominated
2011	24fps International Short Film Festival	Best Short Film	Pioneer	Won
2011	Ashland Independent Film Festival	Best Short Film	Pioneer	Won
2011	Eastern Oregon Film Festival	Best Short Film	Pioneer	Nominated
2011	Hamptons International Film Festival	Golden Starfish Award	Pioneer	Nominated
2011	Philadelphia Film Festival	Special Jury Award	Pioneer	Won
2011	Sundance Film Festival	Short Filmmaking Award	Pioneer	Nominated
2011	SXSW Film Festival	Competition Award	Pioneer	Won
2011	SXSW Film Festival	Grand Jury Award	Pioneer	Won
2013	Chicago Film Critics Association Awards	Best Editing	Upstream Color	Nominated
2013	Los Angeles Film Critics Association Awards	Best Editing	Upstream Color	Nominated
2013	Deauville Film Festival	Grand Special Prize	Ain't Them Bodies Saints	Nominated
2013	Gotham Awards	Best Feature	Ain't Them Bodies Saints	Nominated
2013	Palm Springs International Film Festival	Directors To Watch	Ain't Them Bodies Saints	Nominated
2013	Sundance Film Festival	Grand Jury Prize	Ain't Them Bodies Saints	Nominated
2013	Nashville Film Festival	Best Screenplay	Pit Stop	Won
2014	Independent Spirit Awards	John Cassavetes Award	Pit Stop	Nominated
2014	Independent Spirit Awards	Best Editing	Upstream Color	Nominated
2016	Heartland Film Festival	Truly Moving Picture Award	Pete's Dragon	Won
2017	Boston Society of Film Critics	Best Film Editing	A Ghost Story	Won
2017	Deauville Film Festival	Revelation Prize	A Ghost Story	Won
2017	Deauville Film Festival	Critics Prize	A Ghost Story	Won
2017	Deauville Film Festival	Jury Prize	A Ghost Story	Won
2017	Deauville Film Festival	Grand Special Prize	A Ghost Story	Nominated
2017	Fantasia Film Festival	Camera Lucida Award	A Ghost Story	Won
2017	Sitges Film Festival	Carnet Jove Jury Award	A Ghost Story	Won
2017	Sundance Film Festival	Audience Award	A Ghost Story	Nominated
2017	Utah Film Critics Association Awards	Best Director	A Ghost Story	Nominated
2018	Independent Spirit Awards	John Cassavetes Award	A Ghost Story	Nominated
2018	International Online Cinema Awards	Best Film Editing	A Ghost Story	Nominated
2018	London Film Festival	Best Film	The Old Man & the Gun	Nominated
2018	San Diego Film Critics Society Awards	Best Adapted Screenplay	The Old Man & the Gun	Nominated
2021	Cannes Film Festival	Golden Eye	The Year of the Everlasting Storm	Nominated
2021	Chicago Film Critics Association Awards	Best Director	The Green Knight	Nominated
2021	Chicago Film Critics Association Awards	Best Adapted Screenplay	The Green Knight	Nominated
2021	Critics' Choice Super Awards	Best Science Fiction/Fantasy Movie	The Green Knight	Nominated
2021	Detroit Film Critics Society Awards	Best Director	The Green Knight	Nominated
2021	Detroit Film Critics Society Awards	Best Adapted Screenplay	The Green Knight	Nominated
2021	Gotham Awards	Best Feature	The Green Knight	Nominated
2021	Gotham Awards	Best Screenplay	The Green Knight	Nominated
2021	International Online Cinema Awards	Best Adapted Screenplay	The Green Knight	Nominated
2021	National Board of Review Awards	Top Independent Films	The Green Knight	Won
2021	Saturn Awards	Best Fantasy Film	The Green Knight	Nominated
2021	Seattle Film Critics Society	Best Director	The Green Knight	Nominated
2021	Seattle Film Critics Society	Best Screenplay	The Green Knight	Nominated
2021	Washington DC Area Film Critics Association Awards	Best Film	The Green Knight	Nominated
2021	Washington DC Area Film Critics Association Awards	Best Director	The Green Knight	Nominated
