= Masterminds (Canadian TV series) =

Property crime documentary series

- Genre: Documentary; True crime; Property crime
- Directed by: James Hyslop
- Narrated by: Jamie Watson
- Composers: David Shaw; Craig Marshall
- Country of origin: Canada
- Original language: English
- No. of seasons: 4
- No. of episodes: 61

Production
- Producer: Cameron Rothery
- Running time: ~22 minutes
- Production company: Red Apple Entertainment

Original release
- Network: History (Canadian TV channel)
- Release: July 16, 2003 – May 5, 2007

Masterminds is a true crime documentary television series produced in Canada with truTV (formerly Court TV). Each 30 minute episode features one true property crime story. The profiled property crimes generally involve large sums of cash or merchandise and, more important, extremely unusual and/or elaborate methods of criminal operation which were never before (and sometimes never since) seen by law enforcement agencies. With a few notable exceptions, most criminals profiled in this series were caught within a couple of years of committing their crime(s).

== Episodes ==
| Episode | Show Title | Subject (crime) [country] |
|---|---|---|
| 1 | The Anthon Forgeries | Mark Hofmann (antique document forgery) |
| 2 | The Dunbar Heist | Dunbar Armored robbery |
| 3 | The Knightsbridge Heist | Knightsbridge Security Deposit robbery [ UK ] |
| 4 | A Man Called Hollywood | Scott Scurlock (bank robber) |
| 5 | Double Crossed | Charles Daughtery (imposter, fraudster) |
| 6 | The Laguna Niguel Heist | Amil Dinsio (United California Bank robbery) |
| 7 | A Smuggler Supreme | Brian O'Dea (Drug Smuggling) |
| 8 | The Hotel Pierre Heist | Bobby Comfort (Pierre Hotel robbery) |
| 9 | The Perfect Score | William Smarto (Bank safety deposit box burglary) |
| 10 | A Day at the Races | Chris Harn 2002 Breeders' Cup betting scandal |
| 11 | The Stopwatch Heist | Paddy Mitchell (Bank Robbery) |
| 12 | The King of Car Thieves | Bill Dhaliwal (Auto theft & cloning) [ Canada ] |
| 13 | The Riviera Job | Albert Spaggiari (Bank Vault Robbery) [ France ] |
| 14 | The Dinner Set Gang | Peter Salerno and Dominick Latella of the Dinner Set Gang |
| 15 | Safe Landing (aka A Gem Of A Heist) | Tony Granims, Michael Ornelas, Mark Collins (commercial burglaries) |
| 16 | The Forger's Art | John Drewe (art fraud) [ UK ] |
| 17 | Fool's Gold | Michael de Guzman and Bre-X (Geological Fraud, Investor Fraud) |
| 18 | The Bandit Queen | Judy Amar (House Burglary) |
| 19 | The James Bond Gang | Terence Lawton, Bruce Anderson, David Kirkland & Walter Smith (burglaries) |
| 20 | The Dublin Job | Martin Cahill [ Ireland ] |
| 21 | Confessions of a Master Jewel Thief | Bill Mason (jewel theft) |
| 22 | The Friday Night Robber | Carl Gugasian |
| 23 | The Kansas City Diamond Heist | Clarence Burnett (Tivol jewelry heist) |
| 24 | The Silver Bandit | Blane David Nordahl (cat/stealth home burglaries) |
| 25 | The Cairo Caper (also known as Stealing History) | Jonathan Tokeley-Parry (Egyptian artifact smuggling) |
| 26 | Slot Machine Genius | Tommy Glenn Carmichael (hacking slot machines) |
| 27 | The Jewelry Show Job | William Hanhardt (safety deposit box robbery) |
| 28 | Air America | Rik Luytjes (Drug Smuggling) |
| 29 | The Memorial Day Heist | Jerry Clemente (police officer, ringleader of bank robbery) |
| 30 | The Disappearing Man | Steven Hadley (John Deere Bank theft) |
| 31 | The Superthief | Jack McClean (burglaries) |
| 32 | The Stander Gang | Andre Stander [ Union of South Africa ] |
| 33 | Crazy Eddie | Eddie Antar (Retail Fraud) aka Crazy Eddie |
| 34 | The Brinks Matt (sic) Robbery | Brink's-Mat robbery [ UK ] |
| 35 | The Jacksonville Heist | Philip N. Johnson (Loomis Fargo Depot robbery) |
| 36 | Leader of the Pack | Aaron Rogers (commercial burglaries) |
| 37 | The ConRail Boyz | Edward Mongon (Train Robbing) |
| 38 | Hot Wheels | Minjin "Kenny" Yang (Grand Theft Auto and Export to China) |
| 39 | The Phantom Bandit | Gilbert Galvan (bank robbery) [ Canada ] |
| 40 | Making Millions | Steven Jory (Counterfeit banknotes) [ UK ] |
| 41 | The Air Cargo Millions | Hoa Lam Ong (cargo depot thefts) [ Canada ] |
| 42 | Halloween Heist | Craig Pritchert, Nova Guthrie (Bank Robbery) |
| 43 | The Social Register Gang | Raymond Flynn (home burglaries) |
| 44 | Stealing Las Vegas | Dennis Nikrasch (Gaming Fraud) |
| 45 | Cleaning House (aka Maid In The Shade) | Carrie Lee Jenkins |
| 46 | Money Bags | Maurizio Percan (Car Part Theft/Airbag resale) |
| 47 | The Berlin Heist | Kallet Alvarazi (Bank Heist) [ Germany ] |
| 48 | The Highway Robber (aka The Highway Bandit) | David Brankle (bank robberies) |
| 49 | The Great Escape | Jeffrey Manchester (commercial robberies) |
| 50 | Off The Rack (aka Fashion Crime) | Clothing theft on New York's Fashion Avenue |
| 51 | The Art of Double Dealing (aka Copycat Millions) | Ely Sakhai (art fraud) |
| 52 | The Motorcycle Bandit | Roni Leibovitz (bank robbery) [ Israel ] |
| 53 | The Invisible Man | Stephen Blumberg (theft of antique books) |
| 54 | The Museum Heist | James Quinn (commercial burglaries) |
| 55 | It Takes a Thief | Paul Mathieson (commercial burglaries) |
| 56 | Foul Ball | Wayne Bray (fake sports collectibles) |
| 57 | The Transylvania Job | Transylvania University (rare book collection theft) |
| 58 | Mission Impossible Burglar | Steven Krueger (burglaries) |
| 59 | Money Maker | Wesley Weber (Counterfeit banknotes) [ Canada ] |
| 60 | Bad Medicine | Gerald Barnbaum/Barnes (fake doctor) |
| 61 | The Millennium Diamond | Millennium Dome raid [ UK ) |

== Broadcast ==
As of February 2011, the program is broadcast on History Television and Global TV in Canada, and on truTV in the United States.
