= Forrest Tucker (criminal) =

American career criminal (1920–2004)

- Born: Forrest Silva Tucker; June 23, 1920; Miami, Florida, U.S.
- Died: May 29, 2004 (aged 83); FMC Fort Worth, Fort Worth, Texas, U.S.
- Resting place: Skyvue Memorial Gardens, Mansfield, Texas
- Other name: Woody Tucker
- Known for: Multiple escapes from prison detention
- Allegiance: The Over-the-Hill Gang
- Convictions: Armed bank robbery; Resisting arrest; Escape from federal detention
- Criminal charges: 18 U.S.C. §§ 2113(a) & 2113(d): Armed bank robbery; 18 U.S.C. § 111: Resisting arrest; 18 U.S.C. § 751: Escape from federal detention; Car theft (as a juvenile); Others
- Penalty: Reform school (as a juvenile); Multiple federal and state prison sentences
- Accomplices: Richard Bellew; Theodore Green; William McGirk; John Waller
- Escaped: 18+ incidents

Forrest Silva "Woody" Tucker (June 23, 1920 – May 29, 2004) was an American career criminal first imprisoned at age 15 who spent the rest of his life in and out of jail. He is best known as an escape artist, having escaped from prison "18 times successfully and 12 times unsuccessfully", by his own reckoning. The 2018 film The Old Man & the Gun, starring Robert Redford as Tucker, is based on his life.

== Early life ==
Forrest Silva Tucker was born June 23, 1920, in Miami, Florida, to Leroy Morgan Tucker (1890–1938) and Carmen Tucker (née Silva; 1898–1964). Leroy Tucker, a heavy-equipment operator, left the family when Forrest was six years old. Forrest was raised in Stuart, Florida by his grandmother Ellen Silva (née Morgan). His first escape from detention happened in the spring of 1936, after he was incarcerated for car theft.

== Personal life ==
Tucker married three times and had two children, a boy and a girl; none of his wives knew of his criminal career until they were informed by police.

== Prison escapes ==
A former inmate of Alcatraz Federal Penitentiary, Tucker was able to escape from the authorities when he was temporarily moved to a hospital in San Francisco for an operation. He was captured a few hours later still in handcuffs and a hospital gown. His most famous escape was in the summer of 1979 from San Quentin State Prison in California, when he and two confederates built a kayak and paddled away in full view of the guards. He was not apprehended for twenty one years, during which time he and a gang went on a crime spree.

Tucker's crimes of choice were bank robberies. Law enforcement estimates Tucker stole over $4 million from banks during his career. Tucker wrote a number of books about his life, including Alcatraz: The True Story, and The Can Opener, although it is unclear if they were ever published.

While living in a retirement community in Pompano Beach, Florida, at the age of 79 and married for the third time, Tucker by himself robbed an estimated four banks in the local community. In 2000, law enforcement apprehended Tucker; the Court sentenced him to 13 years in prison at the Federal Medical Center, Fort Worth (now known as Federal Correctional Institution, Fort Worth). Tucker did not live out his sentence and died in prison less than 4 years later, on May 29, 2004, at the age of 83. He is buried in Mansfield, TX.

In 2003, David Grann in The New Yorker profiled Tucker in a piece titled "The Old Man and the Gun", which described Tucker's most recent bank robbery.

== Film ==
In 2010, a film version of Tucker's life, The Old Man & the Gun, was optioned by Anthony Mastromauro of Identity Films. It had previously been in development at Warner Bros. Pictures. Robert Redford starred in and produced the film, while David Lowery wrote and directed it. The film was released on September 28, 2018. Redford announced his intention to retire from acting after the film.
