= Ken Hixon =

American screenwriter

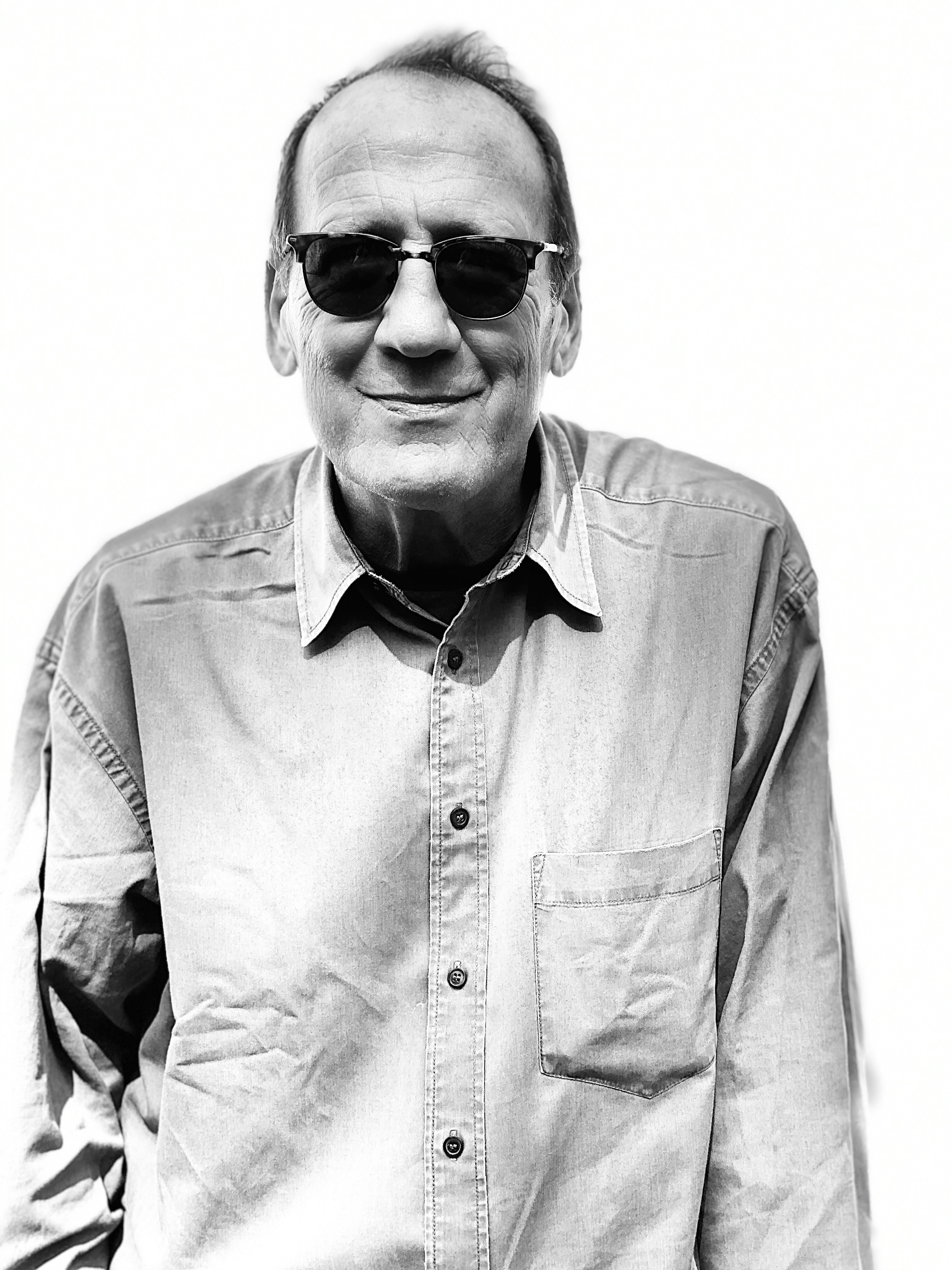
Ken Hixon, October 2019

Ken Hixon (b. 1951) is an American screenwriter, best known for his scripts for Welcome to the Rileys (2010), City by the Sea (2002) and Inventing the Abbotts (1997).

== Early life ==
Born in Indianapolis, Indiana, he began acting as a child in community theater. Hixon studied acting at the American Conservatory Theater in San Francisco. His classmates included Anna Deavere Smith, Gregory Itzin, M. C. Gainey and Harry Hamlin.

== Career ==
Hixon was a stage actor who worked in regional theater, including a Los Angeles production of Eugene O'Neill's two-character play Hughie with Charles Hallahan in 1979. Hixon's roles in film and television included appearances in George A. Romero's Knightriders (1981), Bitter Harvest (1981), and The Hollywood Knights (1980).

In the early 1980s he transitioned from acting to screenwriting. His writing credits include Incident at Deception Ridge (1994), Morgan Stewart's Coming Home (1987), and Grandview, U.S.A. (1984). Two of his television films, Secret Sins of the Father (1994) and Caught in the Act (1993), were nominated for the Edgar Allan Poe Award by the Mystery Writers of America. City by the Sea (1997) was adapted from the Esquire magazine article Mark of a Murderer written by Michael McAlary. In 2019, he co-wrote the heist thriller Finding Steve McQueen, based on the United California Bank robbery. He also co-wrote Unbroken: Path to Redemption (2019).
