= As Cool as I Am (film) =

- Theatrical release poster
- Directed by: Max Mayer
- Screenplay by: Virginia Korus Spragg
- Based on: As Cool as I Am by Pete Fromm
- Produced by: Anthony Mastromauro; Judd Payne; Matt Williams
- Starring: Claire Danes; Sarah Bolger; James Marsden; Jon Tenney
- Cinematography: Tim Suhrstedt
- Edited by: Tracey Wadmore-Smith
- Music by: Christopher Lennertz
- Distributed by: IFC Films
- Release date: June 21, 2013
- Running time: 92 minutes
- Country: United States
- Language: English

As Cool as I Am is a 2013 American comedy-drama film directed by Max Mayer. It is based on the novel of the same name by Pete Fromm. Claire Danes, Sarah Bolger and James Marsden star as the Diamond family. Filming on the adaptation began in New Mexico in May 2011. The film was released in the United States on June 21, 2013, by IFC Films.

== Plot ==
Lucy is a self-confessed tomboy who gets on well with her father Chuck, but is frequently separated from him for months on end when he works in Canada. Her relationship with her mother Lainee is easy-going provided she keeps the house tidy. Lucy is even allowed to drive her mother's car, even though she is too young to apply for a license. When her father comes back, which is only three times a year, Lucy says that she skips a whole week of school and that Lainee lies to Chuck about not having a job and stays home. Chuck appears to be what Lucy calls an "old-fashioned" man because he wants to provide for the family and therefore looks down upon Lainee having a job.

After a run in with Scott Booker, who is annoying Lucy's best friend Kenny, Lucy kisses Scott in return for him not beating up Kenny. Lucy becomes upset with herself after Scott says she is a bad kisser and wished that he hadn't been her first kiss. Kenny then says that memories are "malleable," so Lucy could pretend that her first kiss was Kenny and then she would slowly start to think that was true. Lucy decides that the only way she could believe this is if Kenny does kiss her, resulting in a friends-with-benefits type relationship. Meanwhile, Lainee begins to have a wandering eye for a speaker that comes in to talk to Lainee's workplace. Lainee eventually sleeps with him and comes home at 5:00 a.m., with Lucy still up and realizing what her mother has done. Chuck then comes home unexpectedly and Lucy outs Lainee's job to her father in order to make sure he doesn't find out about her mother's infidelity. She also reveals that she kissed two boys while her father was gone.

After her mother and father start arguing, Lucy becomes upset with herself and runs off to Kenny's house. He is still asleep and she wakes him up by crawling through his window and eventually they have sex in Kenny's bed. Lucy freaks out and runs out of Kenny's front door, passing his mother on the way. Lucy runs home and hears her parents having sex upstairs. Because Kenny and Lucy did not use a condom, Lucy goes to Planned Parenthood where they give her a morning after pill, a box of condoms, and birth control pills. She stuffs this box into her drawers when her father calls her. She goes downstairs to find Kenny waiting for her. Kenny discreetly tells her about the morning-after pill and to his relief, she tells him that she has already taken it. Kenny's mother then calls on the phone and Chuck invites Kenny and his mother to Easter brunch that Sunday. While at lunch, Kenny's mother outs Lucy and Kenny's love affair. Lainee and Chuck become offended, not believing Kenny's mother and saying that she is lying. While Kenny and Lucy are feeding leftovers from their meal to neighborhood dogs, Lucy announces that she doesn't want to have sex again and Kenny agrees.

When Lucy comes home she finds her father has dragged Scott Booker into the house to apologize and verbally abuses him until he does. Lucy starts to see another side of her father that she has never seen before. She starts to realize that her parents' marriage is not as solid as she had imagined. She realizes that her father's extended stays abroad are not typical of other fathers and that her mother does not pine for her father as much as Lucy does. When Kenny moves away, Lucy feels lonely, goes to a party and is raped. She also begins to realize that there is more to her father's extended stays in Canada than she had previously imagined.

== Cast ==
- James Marsden as Chuck Diamond
- Claire Danes as Lainee Diamond
- Sarah Bolger as Lucy Diamond
- Thomas Mann as Kenny Crauder
- Jon Tenney as Bob
- Jeremy Sisto as Guy Karlsburg
- Anika Noni Rose as Frances
- Mario Batali as Himself
- Rhys Coiro as Ron
- Peter Fonda as Gerald

== Release ==
On November 19, 2012, it was announced IFC Films had acquired all distribution rights to the film and planned a 2013 release. It had a limited release by IFC Films on June 21, 2013, in the United States.

== Reception ==
The film has an approval rating of 14% on Rotten Tomatoes from seven critic reviews. On Metacritic, the film has a weighted average score of 28 out of 100 based on six critics, indicating "generally unfavorable" reviews.
