= Bill Mason (jewel thief) =

American jewel thief (born 1940)

Bill Mason (born 1940 in Hundred, West Virginia) is an American jewel thief who, in his 2004 autobiography Confessions of a Master Jewel Thief, claimed that he has stolen $35,000,000 in property from the private residences and hotel rooms, with targets including Phyllis Diller, Johnny Weissmuller and Armand Hammer.

== In popular culture ==
In 2007, the second story on the episode "Religious Prey: Greater Ministries Int'l / It Takes a Thief", of the television series American Greed, covered his story, including extensive interviews with Mason.

In 2010, Confessions of a Master Jewel Thief was optioned by Anthony Mastromauro of Identity Films.
