= Judy Amar =

American former thief

- Born: 1946/1947 (age 78–79); Arkansas, U.S.
- Known for: Over 500 house burglaries
- Criminal penalty: 10 years imprisonment

Judy Amar is an American former thief, who committed 400–500 burglaries in the Boca Raton area of South Florida. Police detectives called her "The Bandit of Boca del Mar." She was profiled in the TV Series Masterminds in the episode "The Bandit Queen."
