= Damon Feldman =

American boxer and businessman (born 1985)

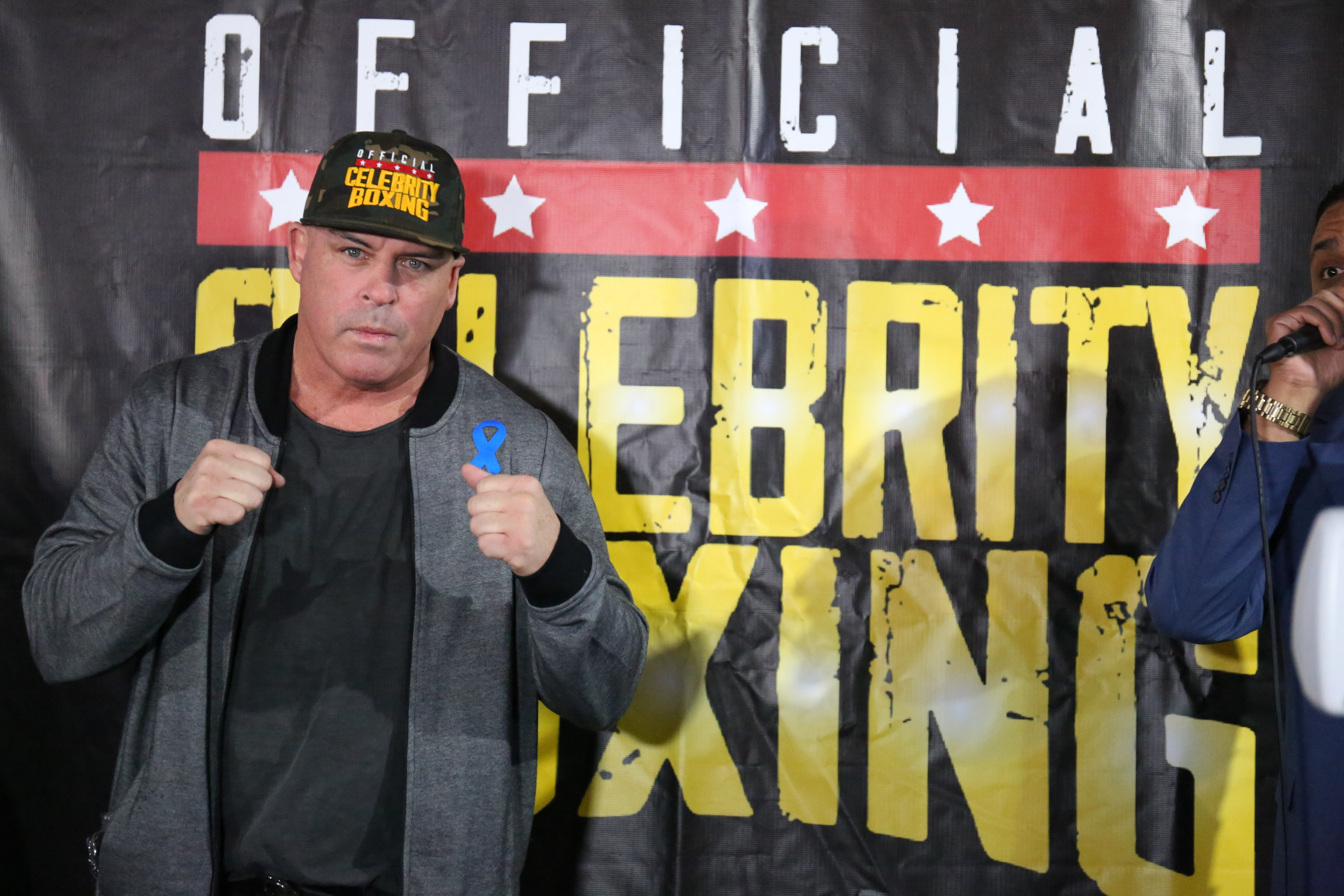
- Born: Damon Richard Feldman; October 5, 1985 (age 41); Broomall, Pennsylvania
- Occupations: Founder and CEO, Official Celebrity Boxing
- Organization: Official Celebrity Boxing
- Known for: Producing and promoting live celebrity boxing events
- Relatives: David Feldman (brother)

Damon Richard Feldman (born October 5, 1985) is an American businessman, boxing promoter, producer, and author. Feldman is the founder and CEO of Official Celebrity Boxing. He authored the book, "16 Minute Man".

== Early life ==
Feldman was born to Martin “Marty” and Dawn Feldman, in Broomall, Pennsylvania. He has a younger brother, David Feldman, who is the founder of Bare Knuckle Fighting Championship. Feldman's father, nicknamed “The Hammer of Thor”, was a professional middle-weight boxer, boxing trainer, and was inducted into the Pennsylvania Boxing Hall of Fame.

When Feldman was four, his mother was a victim of a physical assault, which left her quadriplegic. Feldman and his brother were fostered by several family friends, who cared for them until Feldman turned ten. At that time, Feldman and his brother went back to live with their father, who was training several professional boxers. Brothers Frank "The Animal" Fletcher and Anthony "Two Guns" Fletcher lived in the Feldman home and helped raise the boys.

== Boxing career ==
Feldman started boxing since the age of five under the training of his father. At age thirteen, he was featured in the August 1989 edition of Sports Illustrated. Within the feature, he was recognized for scoring a second-round knockout to win the Philadelphia Junior Olympic boxing title, in the 13-and-under category.

By the age of 18 yrs old, Feldman became a professional boxer. Promoter, J. Russell Peltz entered Feldman in fights at The Blue Horizon, located in North Philadelphia, Pennsylvania. By 1992, Feldman was undefeated, with four knockouts and earned the nickname "Jewish Rocky". However, in 1996, Feldman sustained a career-ending neck injury, and shortly thereafter, he became a fight promotor.

Boxing Record
Date	Opponent	Location	Result
9-15-1992	Bob Saxton	Blue Horizon, Philadelphia	WIN- TKO
3-07-1993	William Rice	Blue Horizon, Philadelphia	WIN- KO
11-20-1993	Robert Edmonds	Pennsylvania Hall, Pa	WIN- UD
10-02-1994	Robert Edmonds	Blue Horizon, Philadelphia	WIN- PTS
1-08-1995	Eduardo Calderon	Blue Horizon, Philadelphia	WIN- UD
3-05-1995	Bill Robinson	Blue Horizon, Philadelphia	WIN- KO
4-30-1995	Alex Caraballo	Blue Horizon, Philadelphia	WIN- KO
10-09-1995	Tyrone Griffin	Blue Horizon, Philadelphia	WIN- UD
11-17-1996	Terry Crawley	Blue Horizon, Philadelphia	WIN- UD

== Business career ==
In 1997, Feldman promoted his first celebrity boxing match, with two Philadelphia locals, Diego Ramos, a radio disc jockey, vs John Bolaris, a weatherman. He continued to build the brand with a variety of matches, pairing local, and national celebrities in the ring. In 2002, Feldman was instrumental in bringing Celebrity Boxing to the Fox network, who aired two hour-long episodes. The first episode included Paula Jones vs Tonya Harding.

Feldman founded the Official Celebrity Boxing (OCB) in 2003. Celebrities use his platform to get back in the spotlight. As Feldman told the New York Post, “If you had 15 minutes of fame, I'll give you the 16th”, which inspired his nickname, "The 16-Minute Man". Feldman's events receive worldwide news coverage.

In 2009, Feldman matched Rodney King, the victim of an infamous police brutality incident, against an ex-police officer. In 2010, Feldman was charged with staging events without a promoter's license and pre-arranging the results of matches. Feldman pled no contest to charges. He also agreed to no longer promote fights in Philadelphia. This encouraged Feldman to promote fights on the West Coast, where the number of events increased. In November 2011, he matched sixteen personalities in eight matches. These matches included Joey Buttafuoco vs Lou Bellera and Amy Fisher vs Nadya Suleman. His other fights included Jose Canseco vs Danny Bonaduce and Michael Lohan vs Kato Kaelin.

Feldman has gained a national media presence, appearing multiple times on The Howard Stern Show, CNN, TMZ, and the Daily Mail. He continues to promote fights in Miami, Atlantic City, and in the Los Angeles area.

== Personal life ==
Feldman is the father of two children. While not raised in any formal religion, when Feldman's son turned thirteen, Feldman began exploring his Jewish roots and was studying to become a bar mitzvah.
