= Thomas Massey House =

Historic house in Pennsylvania, United States

- 1696 Thomas Massey House
- U.S. National Register of Historic Places
- Pennsylvania state historical marker
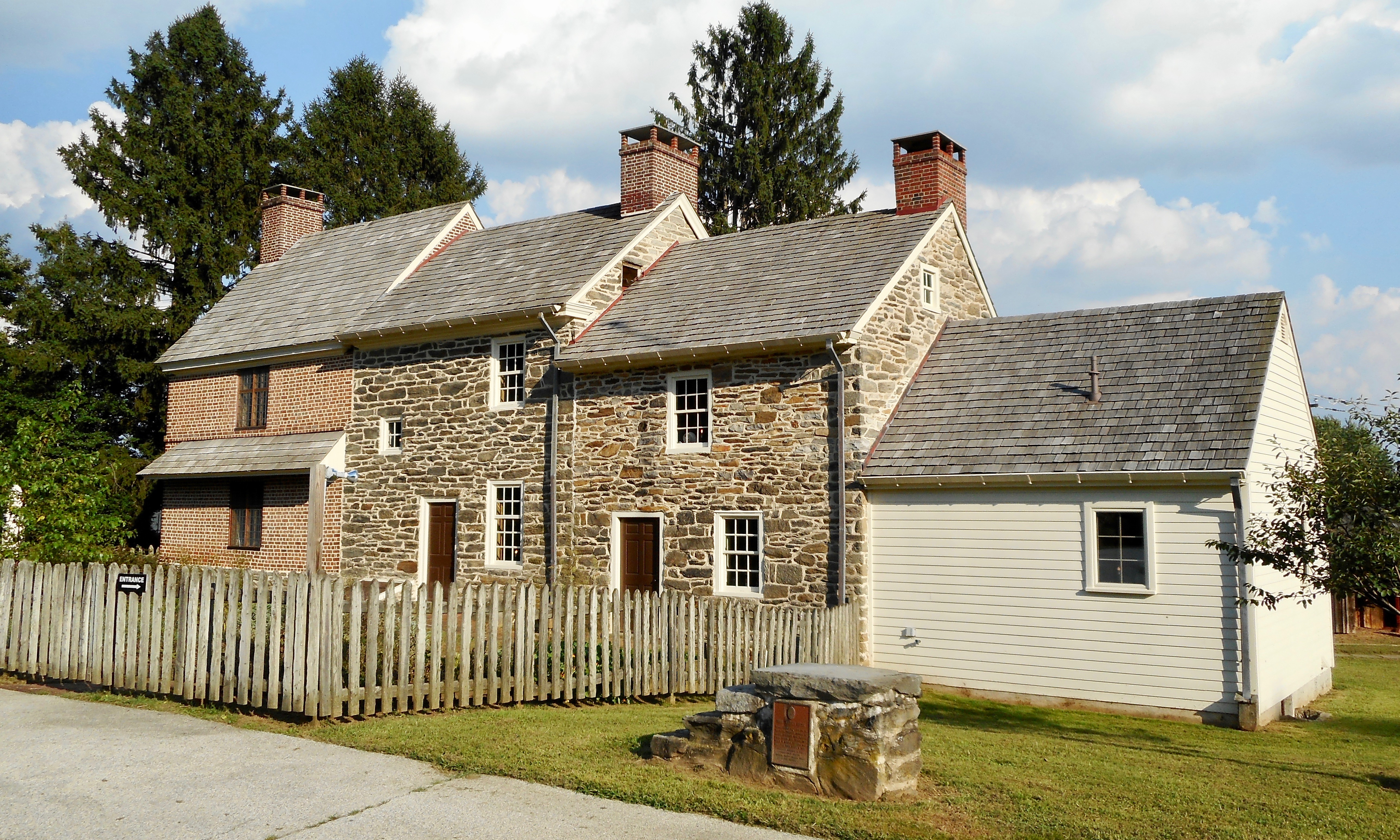
- Thomas Massey House, September 2018

- Location within Pennsylvania Location within the United States
- Location: Lawrence and Springhouse Rds., Broomall, Pennsylvania
- Coordinates: 39°57′55″N 75°21′5″W
- Area: 1 acre (0.40 ha)
- Built: 1696
- Architect: Thomas Massey
- Architectural style: Colonial
- NRHP reference No.: 70000904

Significant dates
- Added to NRHP: November 16, 1970
- Designated PHMC: May 09, 1986

The 1696 Thomas Massey House is one of the oldest English Quaker homes in the Commonwealth of Pennsylvania. It is a 2-story brick and stone house, originally constructed by the English, Quaker settler, Thomas Massey in 1696. It is located on Lawrence Road near Sproul Road in Broomall, Pennsylvania.

== Thomas Massey ==
Thomas Massey was born in the village of Marpoole (Marple) in Cheshire, England. He was a Quaker and an indentured servant to Francis Stanfield, who arranged for him and seven other indentured servants to emigrate to America. Thomas set sail from Chester, England aboard the ketch "Endeavor". He landed in Philadelphia, PA on September 29, 1683, at the age of twenty. After Thomas worked off his indenture, he received 50 acres (20 ha) of land from his master and another 50 acres from William Penn. In 1692, at age 29, Thomas married 22-year-old, Phebe Taylor, whom he had met aboard the Endeavor. Together they had seven children: Esther (1693), Mordecai (1695), James (1697), Hannah (1699), Thomas (1701), Phoebe (1705) and Mary (1707). Thomas Massey died in 1707/08 and Phebe remarried two years later. Their oldest son, Mordecai inherited the house and it remained in the Massey family until 1925.

== Building history ==
Thomas Massey built the original brick section in 1696 as an addition to an earlier wooden house. Thomas's son Mordecai Massey likely tore down the wooden house and built the first stone addition during the 1730s. A stone walled kitchen was added in the early nineteenth century with a second story above the kitchen added about 1860.

The house remained in the Massey family until 1925, and was used as a farmhouse into the 1930s when a furnace and electrical wiring were added. When the land around the house was developed into suburban housing, the Massey House was used for storage and painting.

In 1964, the house was saved from demolition by Massey's descendant, Lawrence M.C. Smith. Smith bought the house and 1-acre (0.40 ha) of ground and donated the property to Marple Township on condition that it be restored within ten years. The restoration was completed by architect, John Milner. During the restoration, a walk-in-fireplace and beehive oven were uncovered. Many of the home's original features have been restored and are fully functional.

The house was placed on the National Register of Historic Places in 1970 and is listed on the Historic American Buildings Survey. A Pennsylvania historical marker was dedicated on the site on May 9, 1986.

== Tours and events ==
The house is open to the public for tours from April through October on Sundays from 1 to 4 PM. It is seasonally decorated and furnished with authentic 17th and 18th century items, including some of the home's original fixtures, such as: cabinetry, furniture, cookware and dinnerware, books and tools.

Special events such as: lectures, demonstrations, dinners, cooking classes, gardening presentations and social gatherings are held throughout the year. At dinner events, an authentic colonial meal is prepared in the kitchen and served in the home.

== Images ==
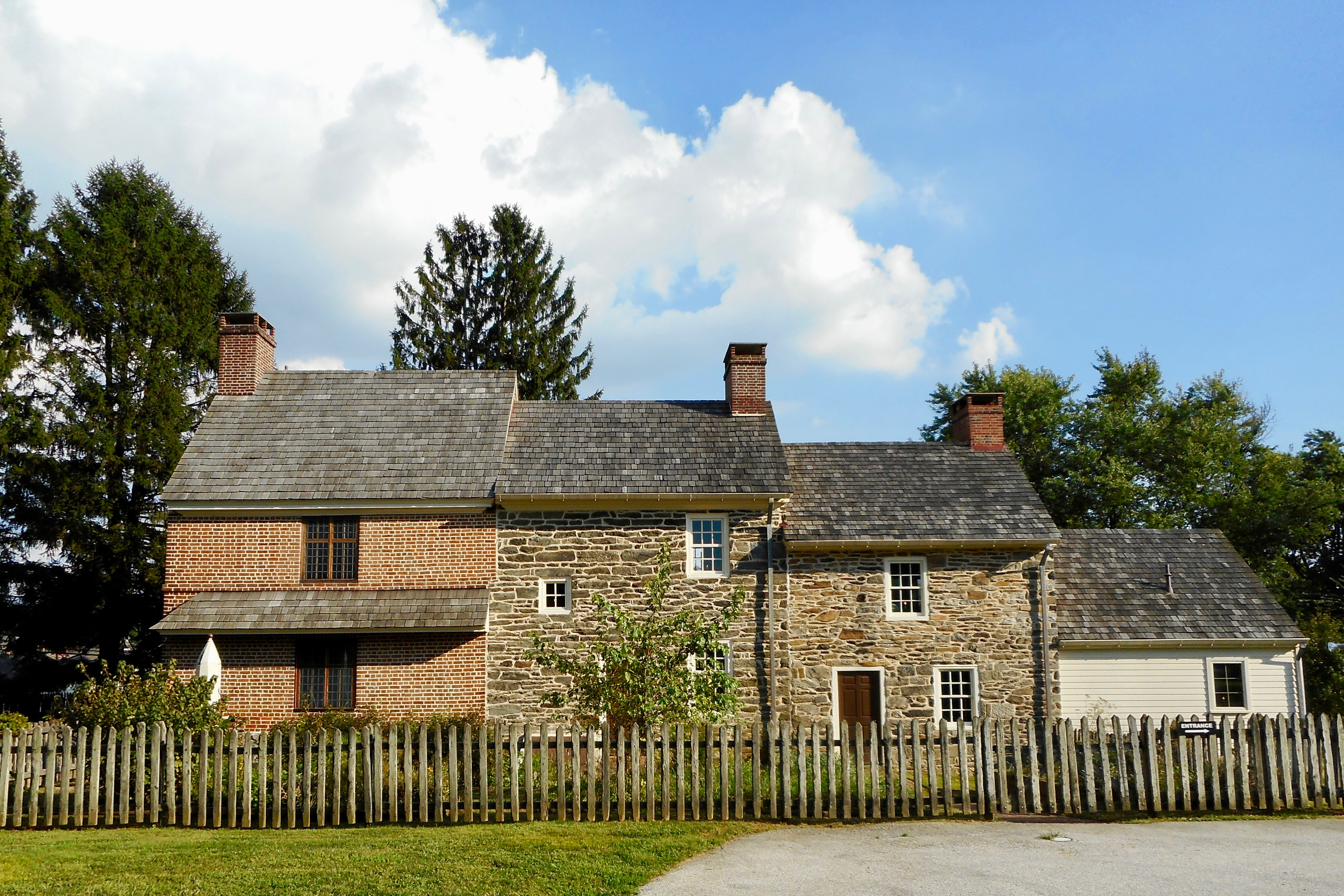
In 2018

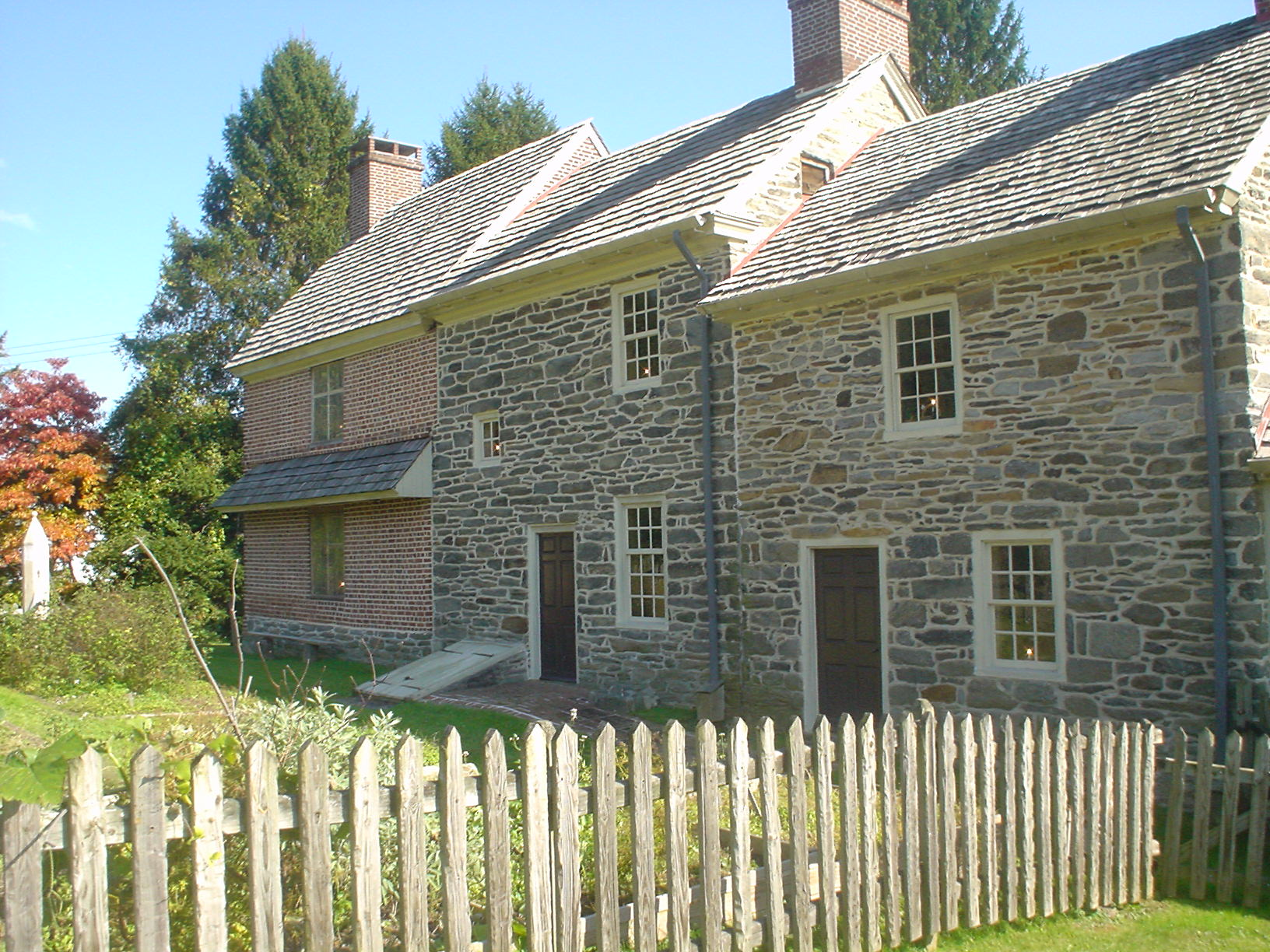
In 2009

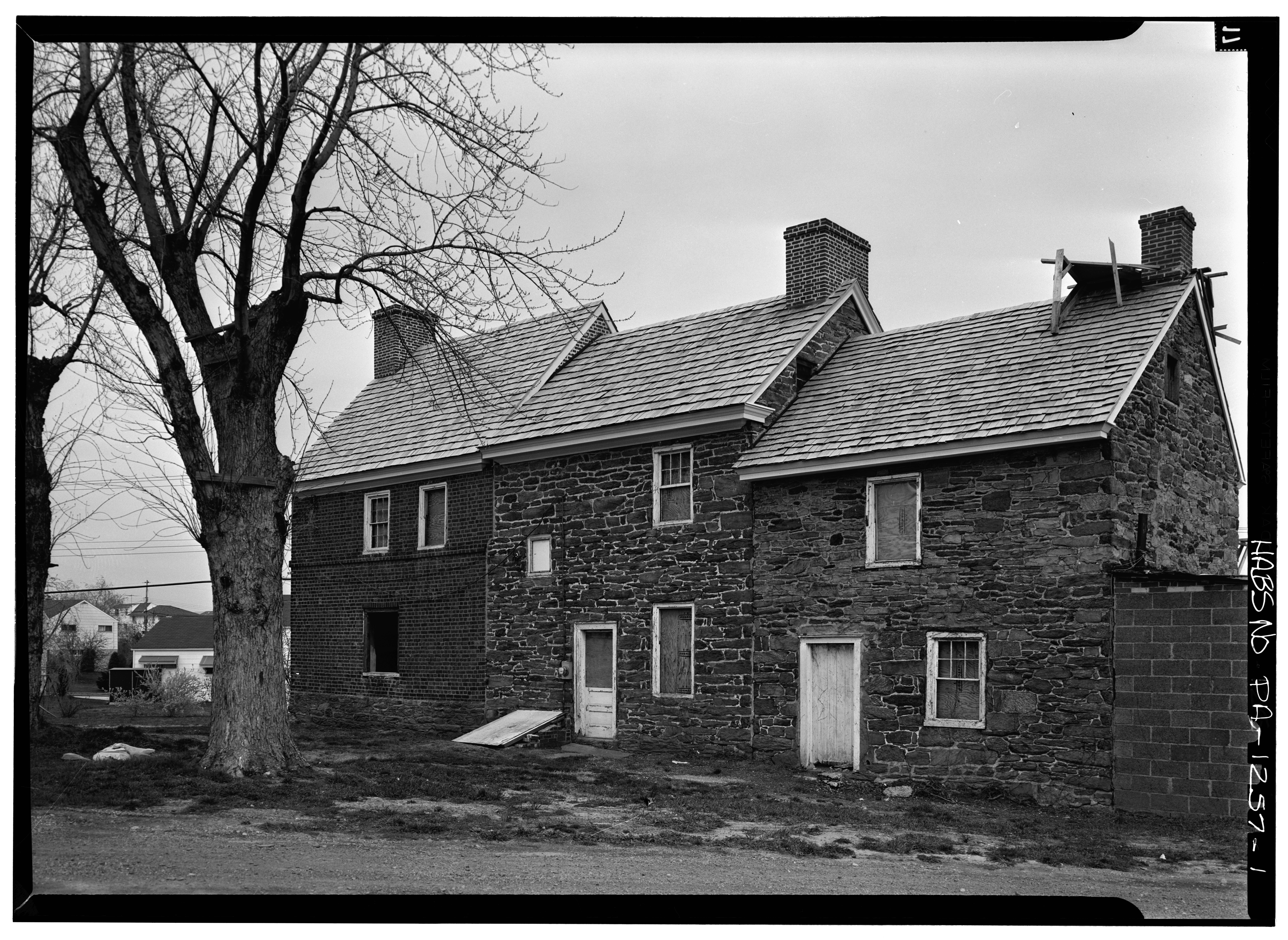

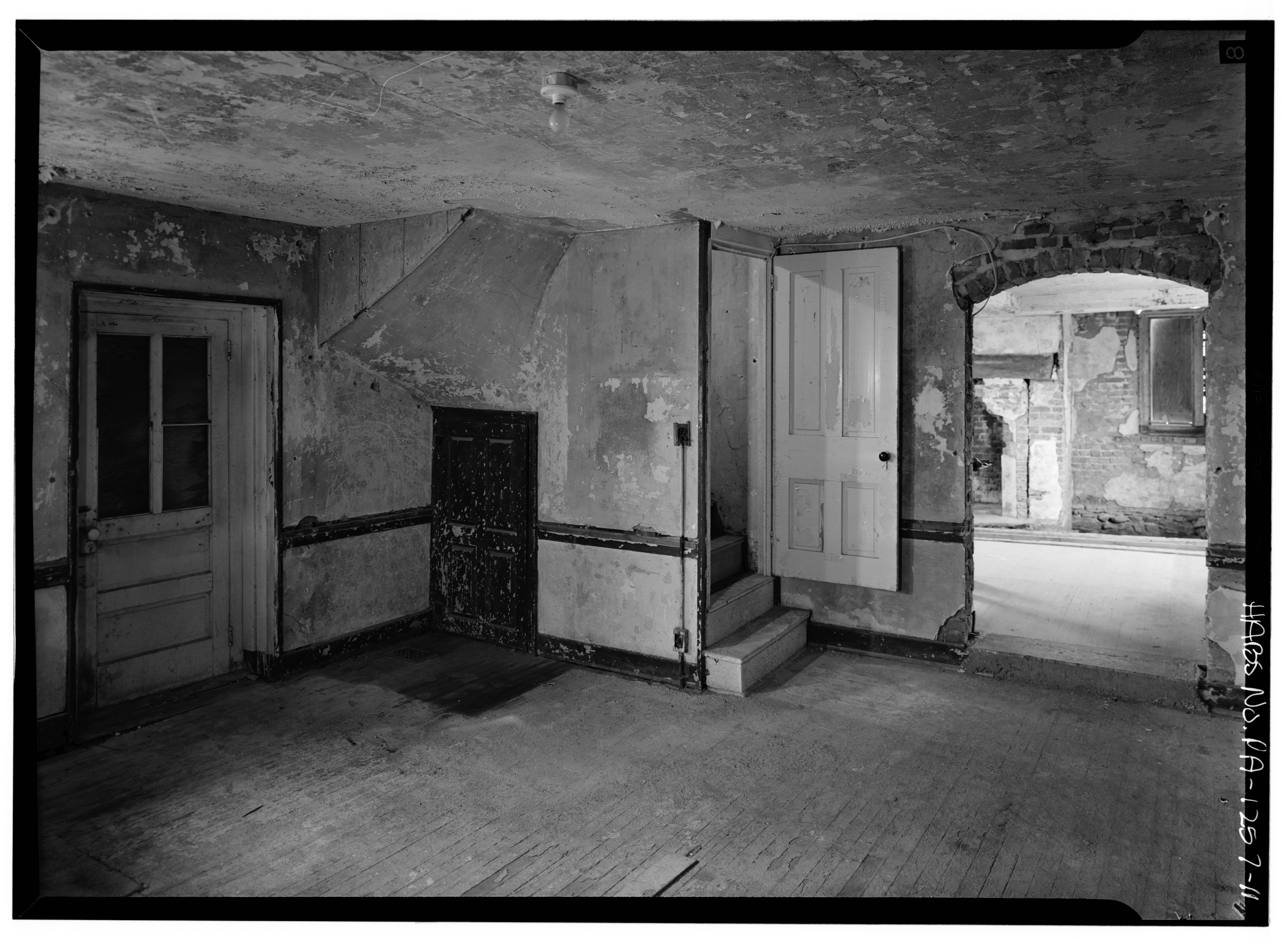

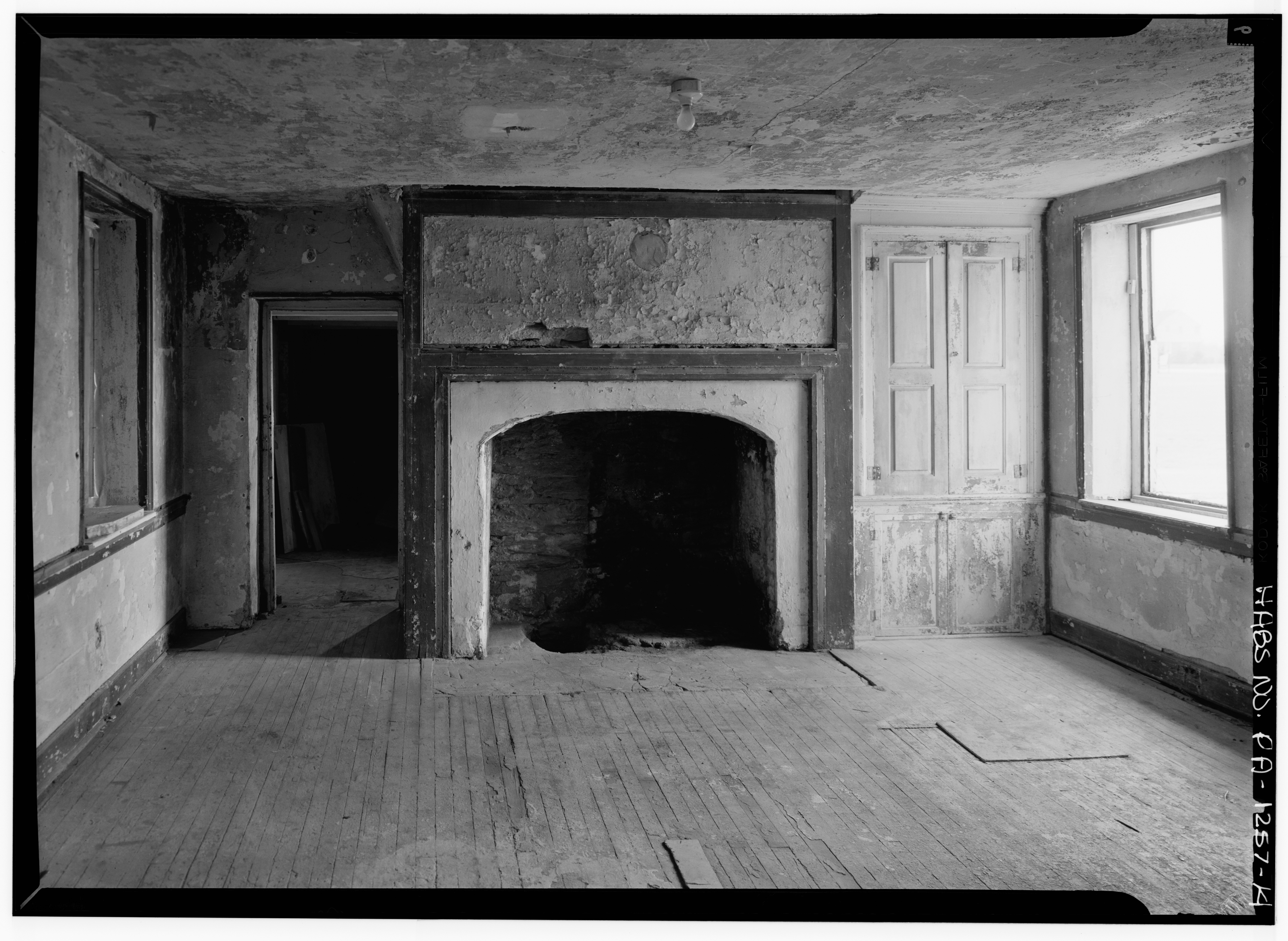

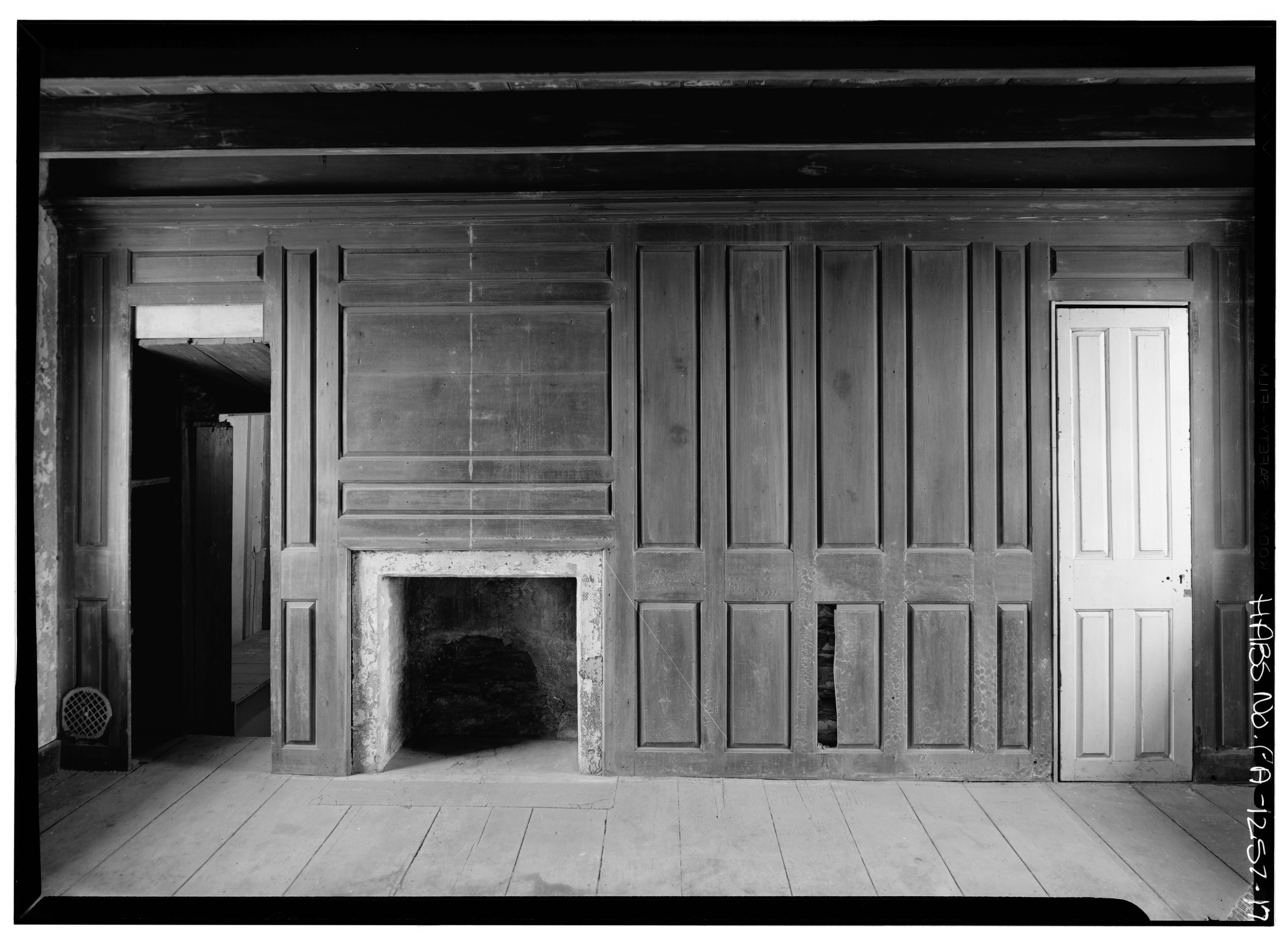

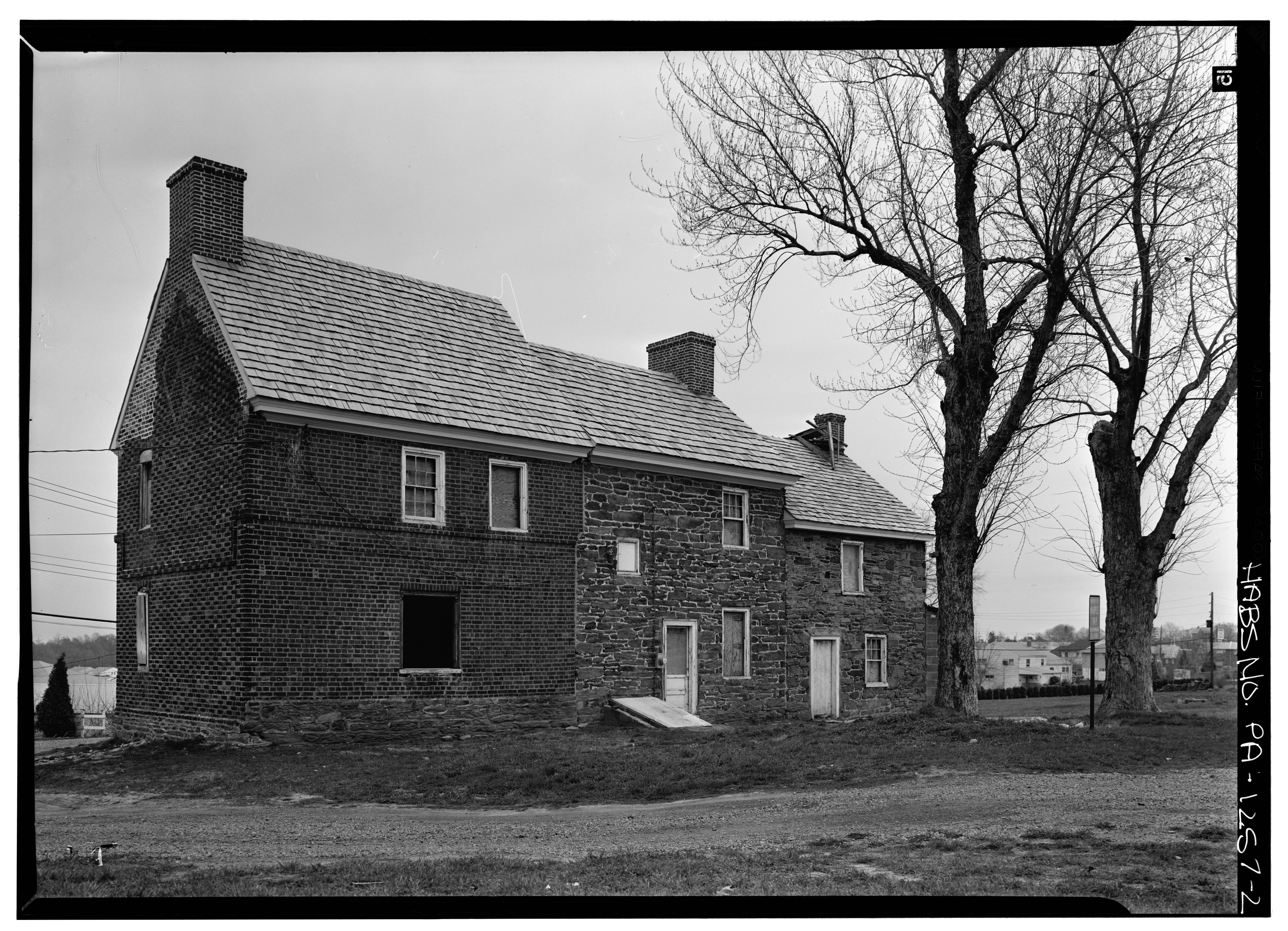

== See also ==
- List of the oldest buildings in Pennsylvania
