= Moonlight Serenade (2009 film) =

- Official released poster
- Directed by: Giancarlo Tallarico
- Screenplay by: Jonathan Abrahams
- Story by: Giancarlo Tallarico
- Produced by: Anthony Mastromauro; Giancarlo Tallarico
- Starring: Amy Adams; Alec Newman; Harriet Sansom Harris
- Cinematography: Eric Larson
- Edited by: Robb Sullivan
- Music by: Joey DeFrancesco
- Production companies: Talestic Entertainment; Barnholtz Entertainment; Chloe Film; Identity Films
- Distributed by: Barnholtz Entertainment; Alliance; Magnolia Pictures
- Release date: December 8, 2009
- Running time: 91 minutes
- Country: United States
- Language: English

Moonlight Serenade is a 2009 musical romance film directed by Giancarlo Tallarico and starring Amy Adams.

== Synopsis ==
A piano player discovers that the girl at the coat-check of a jazz club is a talented singer; she persuades him to form a musical act together.

== Cast ==
- Amy Adams as Chloe
- Alec Newman as Nate Holden
- Harriet Sansom Harris as Angelica Webster
- Jeremy Glazer as Gary

== Release ==
The film was released on December 8, 2009, and distributed by Barnholtz Entertainment, Alliance and Magnolia Pictures.
