= Louis Lombardi =

American actor (born 1968)

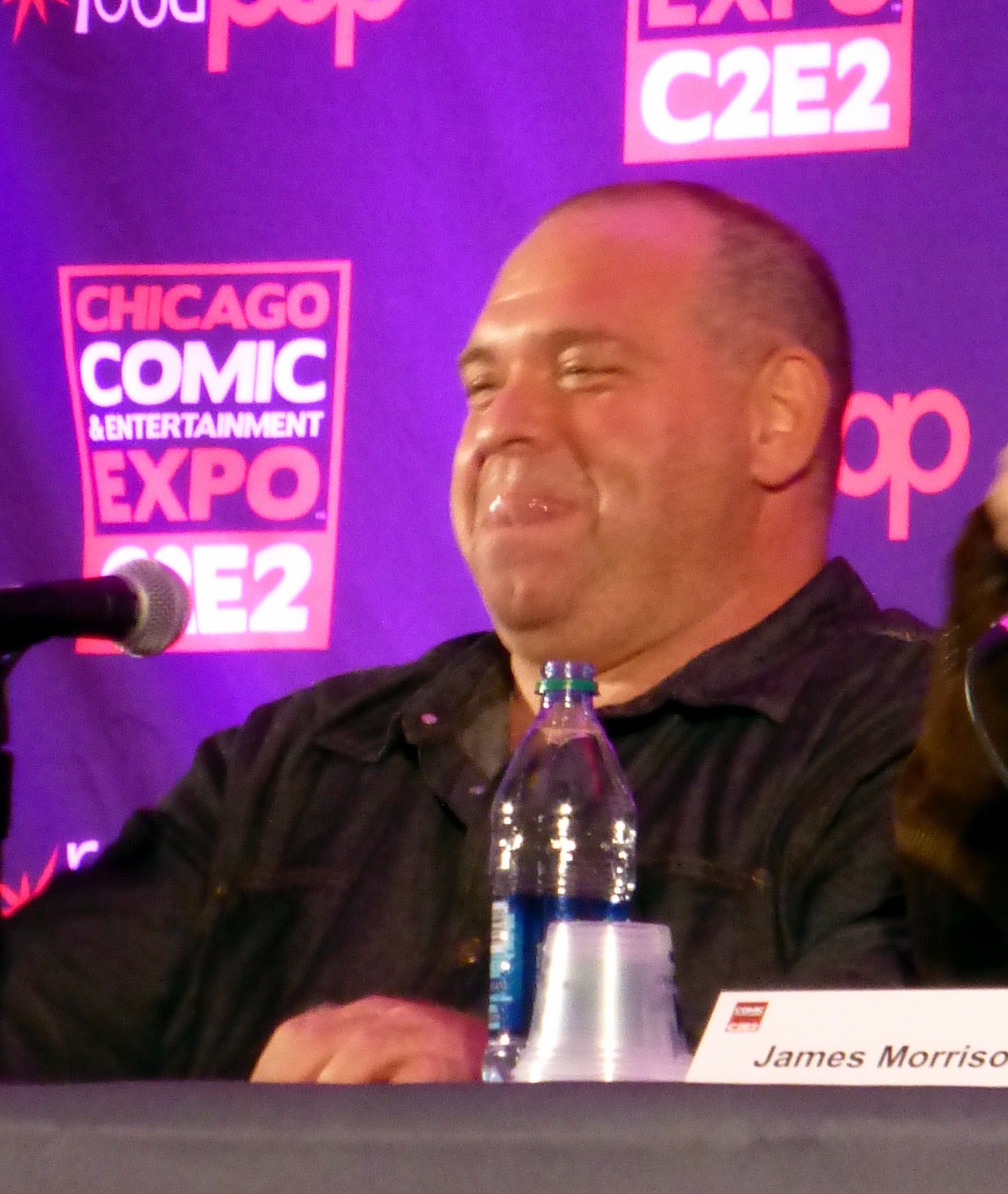
- Lombardi at the 24 Panel at the 2014 Chicago Entertainment Expo
- Born: January 17, 1968 (age 58); The Bronx, New York, U.S.
- Occupation: Actor
- Years active: 1993–present
- Children: 1

Louis Lombardi (born January 17, 1968) is an American actor known for his roles in The Sopranos, Fantasy Island, 24 and Battleship.

== Early life ==
Lombardi was born in The Bronx, New York City, the son of Louis Lombardi Sr.

== Career ==
On television, Lombardi had a recurring role on The Sopranos as Agent Skip Lipari, and guest starred on shows such as Chuck, Entourage, Heroes and CSI. He was a cast member of a 1990s revival of Fantasy Island and played Edgar Stiles on 24. He also played Stucky Fein in the television show Mob City.

He has had roles in films including Beer League, The Usual Suspects, Natural Born Killers, Suicide Kings, Beverly Hills Cop III, The Animal, Spider-Man 2, 3000 Miles to Graceland, The Crew, The Hot Chick, The Spirit, Battleship, and Jersey Boys. He also wrote and directed the film Dough Boys, released in 2008.

== Filmography ==
=== Film ===
Year	Title	Role	Notes
1993	Amongst Friends	Eddie	
1993	The Making of '...And God Spoke'	Teamster	
1993	High Kicks	T.C.	Direct-to-video
1994	Beverly Hills Cop III	Snake	
1994	Natural Born Killers	Deputy Sparky	
1994	Ed Wood	Rental House Manager	
1995	The Usual Suspects	Strausz	
1995	The Immortals	Mike	
1997	Fathers' Day	Matt	
1997	Suicide Kings	Mickey	
1997	Looking for Lola	Louie	
1999	The Boss	Lou	Also director
2000	The Crew	Jimmy Whistles	
2001	3000 Miles to Graceland	Otto Sinclair	
2001	The Animal	Fatty	
2002	Deuces Wild	Philly Babe	
2002	The Hot Chick	Pole Cat Bar Patron	
2002	Hitters	Leoni	
2003	Confidence	Big Al	
2003	Wonderland	Slim Jim	
2004	Spider-Man 2	Poker Player	
2006	Artie Lange's Beer League	Police Chief Gugliamino	
2008	Dough Boys	Lou	Also director
2008	The Spirit	Pathos, etc.	
2010	Chasing 3000	Short Order Cook	
2011	Ronal the Barbarian	The Oracle	Voice; English version
2012	Battleship	Bartender	
2012	Any Day Now	Mr. Blum	
2013	How Sweet It Is	Wally	
2013	Runner Runner	Archie	
2013	2 Dead 2 Kill	Amil Nitrate	
2014	Jersey Boys	Trulio	
2016	Back in the Day	Jerry Velvontie	
2017	Landline	Chaz	
2019	Finding Steve McQueen	Pauly Callahan	
2020	Clover	Paulie	
2020	Givers of Death	Bobby Wine	
2024	Director's Cut	Mister Director	

=== Television ===
Year	Title	Role	Notes
1994	Hardball	Pied Pioneer Heckler	Episode: "Pilot"
1995, 2004	NYPD Blue	Tommy / Gio Puglisi	3 episodes
1997	EZ Streets	Fat Man	5 episodes
1998	Damon	Criminal #1	Episode: "The Exam"
1998–1999	Fantasy Island	Cal	11 episodes
2000	Falcone	Ernie Bello	Episode: "Double Exposure"
2000–2001	The Sopranos	Skip Lipari	9 episodes
2001	The Huntress	Pinky	Episode: "The Hunted/Vegas: Part 2"
2001	Some of My Best Friends	Dominic	Episode: "Fight Night"
2001	Yes, Dear	Jack	Episode: "Guarding Greg"
2002	Philly	Dennis McCarthy	Episode: "Brotherly Love"
2003	CSI: Crime Scene Investigation	Waiter	Episode: "Grissom Versus the Volcano"
2003	Life on Parole	Joey	Television film
2004	The Handler	Mike	Episode: "Bleak House"
2004	Oliver Beene	George Novogroder	2 episodes
2004	Thank God It's Monday	Rocky	Television film
2005–2006	24	Edgar Stiles	37 episodes
2007	Las Vegas	Harris Lipsky	Episode: "Pharaoh 'Nuff"
2007	In Case of Emergency	Todd	Episode: "Proof of Love"
2007	Ugly Betty	Salesman	Episode: "Betty's Wait Problem"
2007–2009	Entourage	Ronnie	3 episodes
2008	CSI: NY	Stan Trovato	Episode: "Forbidden Fruit"
2009	Monk	Tommy G.	Episode: "Mr. Monk Is Someone Else"
2010	Chuck	Scotty	Episode: "Chuck Versus the Fake Name"
2010	In Plain Sight	Dominic Difazzio / Dominic Cleary	Episode: "Fish or Cut Betta"
2010	The Boondocks	Dan Stuckey	Episode: "It's Goin' Down"
2010	Hawaii Five-0	Buddy	Episode: "Ho'apono"
2013	Mob City	Stucky Fein	3 episodes
2016	Driving Arizona	Uncle Jerry	Episode: "Dedication, Commitment, Perseverance, Perspiration"
2017	Small Shots	Dom	2 episodes
2018	The Neighborhood	Tomasso Pergesso	2 episodes
2019	9-1-1	Barry	Episode: "Careful What You Wish For"
2019	Magnum P.I.	Paulie Nuzo	Episode: "Blood Brothers"
2020	Gravesend	Tomasso Pergesso	4 episodes
2021	Young Rock	Uncle Nicky	2 episodes
