= Inventing the Abbotts =

- Theatrical release poster
- Directed by: Pat O'Connor
- Screenplay by: Ken Hixon
- Based on: "Inventing the Abbotts" by Sue Miller
- Produced by: Brian Grazer; Ron Howard; Janet Meyers
- Starring: Liv Tyler; Joaquin Phoenix; Billy Crudup; Jennifer Connelly; Joanna Going; Will Patton; Kathy Baker
- Cinematography: Kenneth MacMillan
- Edited by: Ray Lovejoy
- Music by: Michael Kamen
- Production companies: Fox 2000 Pictures; Imagine Entertainment
- Distributed by: 20th Century Fox
- Release date: April 4, 1997
- Running time: 107 minutes
- Country: United States
- Language: English
- Box office: $5.9 million

Inventing the Abbotts is a 1997 American period coming-of-age film directed by Pat O'Connor, and starring Liv Tyler, Joaquin Phoenix, Billy Crudup, Jennifer Connelly, and Joanna Going. The screenplay by Ken Hixon is based on a short story by Sue Miller. The original music score was composed by Michael Kamen. The film focuses on two brothers and their relationship with the wealthy Abbott sisters. The film was produced by Fox 2000 Pictures and Imagine Entertainment and released by 20th Century Fox on April 4, 1997.

== Plot summary ==
The lives of two families, the Holts and the Abbotts, intersect in the small Illinois town of Haley in the 1950s. Two brothers, J.C. and Doug Holt, are being raised by their single working mother. Their father Charlie was a reckless risk-taker who lost his life when J.C. was two years old and before Doug was born, after driving on a frozen lake over a bet made with Lloyd Abbott. Lloyd had just acquired Charlie's patent for a steel file-drawer in return for almost nothing, consequently becoming one of the town's wealthiest and most-admired citizens. Lloyd and his distant wife, Joan, are the parents of three beautiful daughters, Alice, Eleanor, and Pamela. The parties for the girls' birthdays and other milestones are among the most anticipated events in the town.

Thinking his father's death was Lloyd's fault, and that the money raised from the patent was unfairly stolen from his family, J.C. seeks revenge on Lloyd through the calculated seduction of the Abbott daughters. First he seduces Eleanor, the wildest of the three. As a consequence of their relationship, she is sent away to a mental hospital, and will end up never returning to Haley again. Meanwhile, Doug, who initially admires his brother's libertine lifestyle, starts harboring reciprocated feelings for the youngest Abbott, Pamela. The two awkwardly circle each other, but she protests his early, fumbling sexual advances.

During a summer home from college, J.C. seduces the oldest Abbott daughter, Alice, who is divorcing her abusive husband after the birth of their daughter. The relationship between J.C. and Alice also leads to heartbreak, as well as to Lloyd taking extreme measures to keep them apart.

Amidst the complicated dynamics brought about by their siblings, Doug and Pamela meet again by chance while attending college at Penn and Bryn Mawr, respectively. Their reunion is once again thwarted by the reveal that J.C. has in the meantime started a sexual relationship with Pamela, too. This creates a severe fracture between the two brothers.

When Doug and J.C. come back home for their mother's funeral, they find the document confirming their late father had sold his patent for the very car he drove to his death on the lake. This knowledge does not comfort J.C., who still finds it deeply unfair that they were denied the wealth of the Abbotts for arbitrary reasons. In the end, Doug convinces Lloyd of his true love for Pamela and the two finally find each other for good. The adult Doug, who is narrating the story, recounts how they married one year later and eventually gave birth to two daughters.

== Cast ==
- Liv Tyler as Pamela Abbott
- Joaquin Phoenix as Doug Holt
- Billy Crudup as John Charles "J.C." Holt
- Jennifer Connelly as Eleanor Abbott
- Will Patton as Lloyd Abbott
- Kathy Baker as Helen Holt
- Joanna Going as Alice Abbott
- Barbara Williams as Joan Abbott
- Alessandro Nivola as Peter Vanlaningham

== Production ==
Though the film is set in rural Illinois, it was mostly shot in the region of Northern California, including the areas of Healdsburg, Petaluma, and Santa Rosa. The University of the Pacific in Stockton stood in for scenes set at the University of Pennsylvania.

== Reception ==
Inventing the Abbotts was not well received by critics. On Rotten Tomatoes the film has an approval rating of 37% based on reviews from 27 critics. On Metacritic, which assigns a weighted mean rating out of 100 reviews from film critics, the film has a score of 49 out of 100, based on 21 critics, indicating "mixed or average" reviews.

Roger Ebert, in a 2-star review, praised the acting and the art direction, but criticized the story and slow pacing, saying the film lacked "the cheerful love of human nature that enlivened ... Circle of Friends," Pat O'Connor's previous film which was also about young love in the 1950s.

Janet Maslin of the New York Times said of the young cast, "[Joaquin] Phoenix, so memorably mixed up and inarticulate in To Die For, steps solidly into the assertive role of this film's narrator. [Billy] Crudup smolders well and leaves no mystery about J.C.'s power to attract the sisters. Ms. Connelly, often cast in cheesecake roles, gives this one a sly, vixenish spark."

Emanuel Levy of Variety said the "cast of newcomers is appealing, but this small-town melodrama is so old-fashioned and out-of-touch with contemporary youth that it feels as if it were made the same time that its story is set, in 1957."
