= Broomall, Pennsylvania =

Unincorporated community in Pennsylvania, US

- Census-designated place
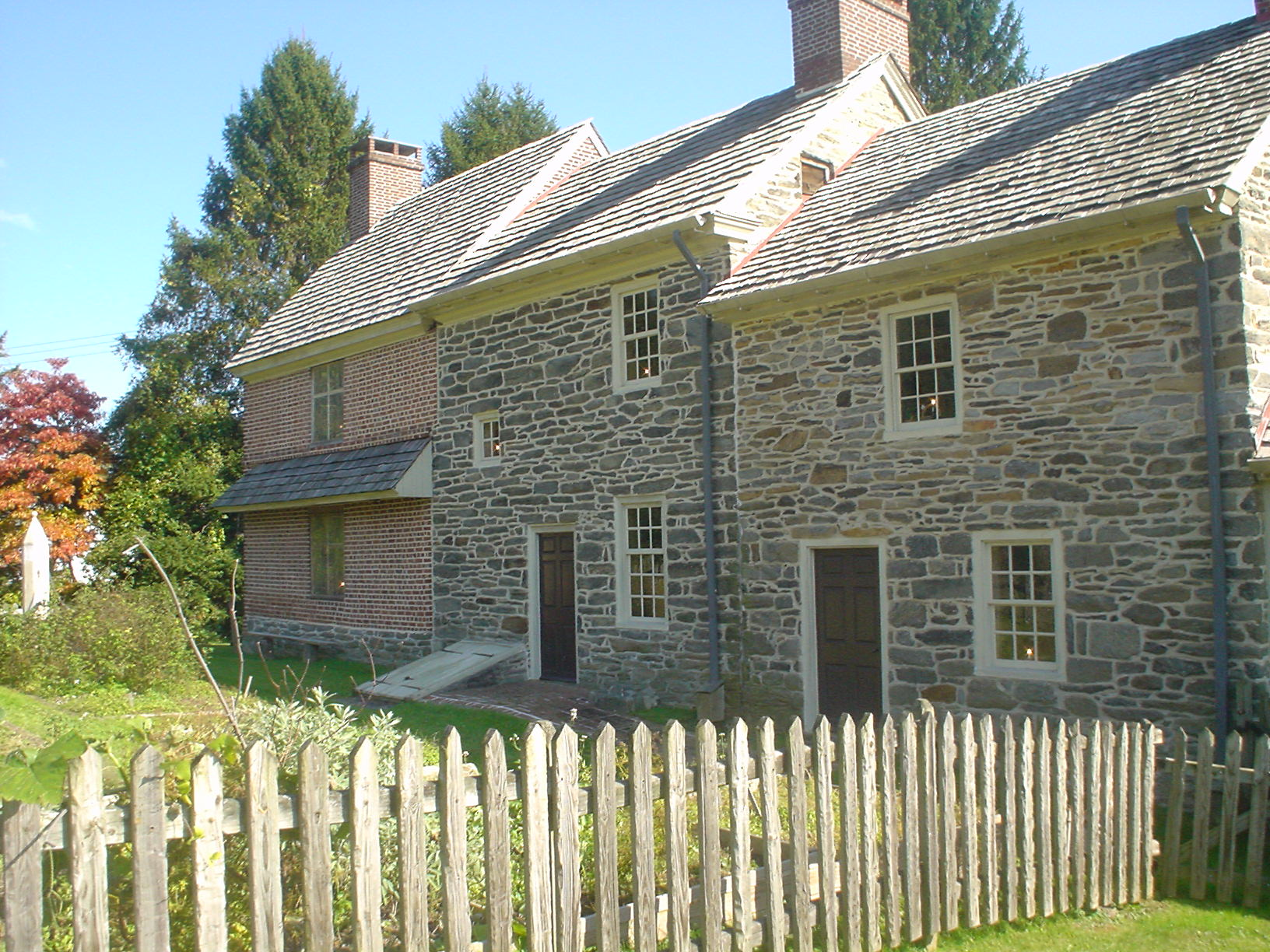
- Thomas Massey House

- Location in Delaware County and the U.S. state of Pennsylvania.
- Coordinates: 39°58′18″N 75°21′17″W
- Country: United States
- State: Pennsylvania
- County: Delaware
- Township: Marple

Area
  - Total: 3.17 sq mi (8.21 km^{2})
  - Land: 3.17 sq mi (8.21 km^{2})
  - Water: 0 sq mi (0.00 km^{2})
- Elevation: 351 ft (107 m)

Population (2020)
  - Total: 11,718
  - Density: 3,698.7/sq mi (1,428.08/km^{2})
- Time zone: UTC-5 (EST)
  - Summer (DST): UTC-4 (EDT)
- ZIP code: 19008
- Area codes: 610 and 484
- FIPS code: 42-09248

Broomall is a census-designated place (CDP) in Marple Township, Pennsylvania, United States. The population was 10,789 at the 2010 census.

== History ==
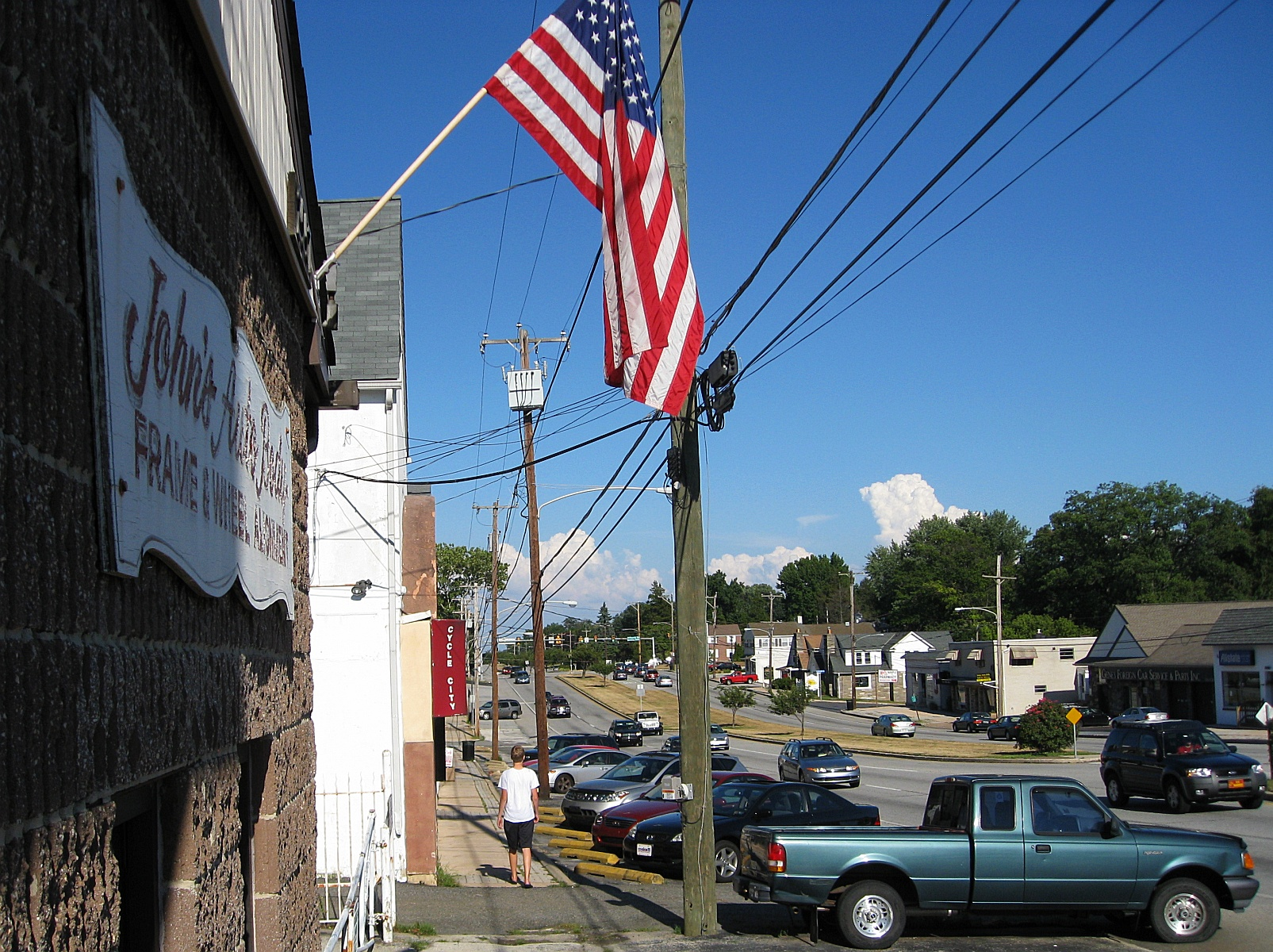
Broomall, looking east on West Chester Pike

This crossroads community was renamed for the post office established to honor John Martin Broomall, a 19th-century U.S. congressman, Electoral College member (at Ulysses S. Grant's 1872 presidential election), and Chester Gas Company president from Upper Chichester Township in Delaware County, Pennsylvania.

Broomall is home to the biotechnology company Drummond Scientific Company. Drummond's Pipet-Aid pipette controller, released in 1972, improved accuracy and pipetting capabilities in laboratories.

The Thomas Massey House is listed on the National Register of Historic Places.

== Geography ==
Broomall is located in northeastern Delaware County at 39°58′18″N 75°21′17″W (39.971561, −75.354674). It is in the eastern part of Marple Township and is bordered to the east by Darby Creek and to the north by Pennsylvania Route 3 (West Chester Pike). Pennsylvania Route 320 (Sproul Road) is the main north–south road in the community. Broomall is 10 miles (16 km) west of Center City Philadelphia.

According to the United States Census Bureau, the CDP has a total area of 2.9 square miles (7.5 km^{2}), all land. The climate is a hot-summer humid continental climate (Dfa) very closely bordering a humid subtropical climate (Cfa). PRISM Climate Group, Oregon State U Average monthly temperatures range from 31.9 °F in January to 77.1 °F in July. PRISM Climate Group, Oregon State U The local hardiness zone is 7a.

== Education ==
Public schools located in Broomall that are part of the Marple Newtown School District are:

- Loomis Elementary
- Russell Elementary
- Worrall Elementary
- Paxon Hollow Middle School.

Marple Newtown Senior High School is the public school for Newtown Square, Newtown Township, and Broomall, Marple Township. Paxon Hollow Middle School Participates in an annual fundraiser for Alex's Lemonade Stand with Haverford Middle School.

== Demographics ==
=== 2020 census ===
As of the 2020 census, Broomall had a population of 11,718. The median age was 46.3 years. 18.8% of residents were under the age of 18 and 23.1% of residents were 65 years of age or older. For every 100 females there were 93.2 males, and for every 100 females age 18 and over there were 91.8 males age 18 and over.

100.0% of residents lived in urban areas, while 0.0% lived in rural areas.

There were 4,471 households in Broomall, of which 28.6% had children under the age of 18 living in them. Of all households, 57.3% were married-couple households, 14.2% were households with a male householder and no spouse or partner present, and 24.2% were households with a female householder and no spouse or partner present. About 23.4% of all households were made up of individuals and 13.1% had someone living alone who was 65 years of age or older.

There were 4,606 housing units, of which 2.9% were vacant. The homeowner vacancy rate was 0.4% and the rental vacancy rate was 4.0%.

Racial composition as of the 2020 census
| Race | Number | Percent |
|---|---|---|
| White | 9,721 | 83.0% |
| Black or African American | 260 | 2.2% |
| American Indian and Alaska Native | 16 | 0.1% |
| Asian | 1,251 | 10.7% |
| Native Hawaiian and Other Pacific Islander | 0 | 0.0% |
| Some other race | 90 | 0.8% |
| Two or more races | 380 | 3.2% |
| Hispanic or Latino (of any race) | 274 | 2.3% |

=== 2000 census ===
As of the census of 2000, there were 11,046 people, 4 households, and 3,148 families residing in the CDP. The population density was 3,807.1 inhabitants per square mile (1,469.9/km^{2}). There were 4,339 housing units at an average density of 1,495.5 per square mile (577.4/km^{2}). The racial makeup of the CDP was 91.41% White, 0.63% African American, 0.10% Native American, 7.17% Asian, 0.16% from other races and 0.53% from two or more races. Hispanic or Latino of any race were 0.62% of the population.

There were 4 households, out of which 28.4% had children under the age of 18 living with them, 62.2% were married couples living together, 8.6% had a female householder with no husband present, and 26.1% were non-families. 22.8% of all households were made up of individuals, and 12.8% had someone living alone who was 65 years of age or older. The average household size was 2.57 and the average family size was 3.06 people.

In the CDP the population was spread out, with 21.4% under the age of 18, 6.5% from 18 to 24, 26.2% from 25 to 44, 24.6% from 45 to 64, and 21.2% who were 65 years of age or older. The median age was 43 years. For every 100 females, there were 92.1 males. For every 100 females age 18 and over, there were 88.8 males.

The median income for a household in the CDP was $52,354, and the median income for a family was $63,902. Males had a median income of $45,181 versus $31,646 for females. The per capita income for the CDP was $24,940. About 2.4% of families and 4.4% of the population were below the poverty line, including 3.7% of those under the age of 18.

Historical population
| Census | Pop. | Note | %± |
|---|---|---|---|
| 2000 | 11,046 | | — |
| 2010 | 10,789 | | −2.3% |
| 2020 | 11,718 | | 8.6% |

== Notable people from Broomall ==
- Mark Arnold, actor notable for his role as the second Joe Perkins on NBC's soap opera Santa Barbara
- Danny Bonaduce, radio/television personality, comedian, and former child actor who as an adult became known for his tumultuous personal life
- Len Cella, comedy film actor and director; his short films Moron Movies appeared on The Tonight Show Starring Johnny Carson
- Natasha Cloud, WNBA player for the New York Liberty
- Damon Feldman Born in Broomall, “Undefeated Professional Boxer”9-0”and creator of Celebrity Boxing”
- Jim Fullington, professional wrestler
- Joe Grady, radio personality
- Carl Gugasian, criminal known as "The Friday Night Bank Robber". He robbed more than 50 banks over a 30-year period, for a total of more than $2 million.
- John Kincade, sports talk show host based in Atlanta for WCNN 680 "The Fan"
- Andrew L. Lewis Jr., United States Secretary of Transportation from 1981 to 1983
- Vincas Krėvė-Mickevičius, Lithuanian writer, poet, novelist, playwright and philologist
- Thomas Massey, English-American Quaker landowner who built the Thomas Massey House
- David Miscavige, leader of the Church of Scientology
- Marta Kauffman-known for co-creating the show Friends
