= Fantasy Island (1998 TV series) =

- Genre: Fantasy; Drama
- Based on: Fantasy Island by Gene Levitt
- Developed by: Bob Josephson
- Starring: Malcolm McDowell; Mädchen Amick; Louis Lombardi; Edward Hibbert; Fyvush Finkel; Sylvia Sidney
- Theme music composer: John Ottman
- Composer: Roger Neill
- Country of origin: United States
- Original language: English
- No. of seasons: 1
- No. of episodes: 13

Production
- Executive producers: Barry Josephson; Barry Sonnenfeld; Diane Frolov; Andrew Schneider
- Running time: 45–48 minutes
- Production companies: Sonnenfeld Josephson Worldwide Entertainment; Columbia TriStar Television

Original release
- Network: ABC
- Release: September 26, 1998 – January 23, 1999

Fantasy Island is an American fantasy drama television series, broadcast on ABC from September 26, 1998 to January 23, 1999, during the 1998–99 television season. A remake of the original Fantasy Island television series, it starred Malcolm McDowell as Mr. Roarke and was developed by Bob Josephson.

== Background ==
In 1998, ABC revived the series in a Saturday time slot. The role of Mr. Roarke was played by Malcolm McDowell and, in contrast to the first series, the supernatural aspect of his character and of Fantasy Island itself was emphasized from the start, along with a dose of dark humor. Director Barry Sonnenfeld, known for his work on The Addams Family movies, was a chief creative force on the new series. Another difference was that the new series was filmed in Hawaii instead of California. The remake followed the fantasies of at least two of Roarke's guests with an additional subplot involving members of his staff – usually Cal and Harry. Whereas the original series featured a separate writer and title for each subplot, the new series was written as several stories but featuring a unified theme and title.

The supporting cast was also expanded for the new series. There was no attempt to reinstate Tattoo, with Roarke instead having a team of assistants – one of whom was a female shapeshifter named Ariel – who were assigned to help create and maintain the various fantasy worlds created on the island. Apparently these assistants were imprisoned on the island in order to pay off some debt (or earn a second chance at life), sometimes hinting that they were in some kind of Limbo, with many parallels between the regulars and William Shakespeare's The Tempest. It was strongly hinted that the island itself was the source of Roarke's mysterious powers as his assistants have been shown wielding its magic with varying degrees of success. Miranda, Roarke's adopted daughter, was human but grew up on the island with similar powers as well. The series was canceled midway through the season and the remaining episodes aired on the Sci Fi Channel. This version also aired on UPN.

In an attempt to contrast this series with the original, the new Mr. Roarke usually wore black. In the first episode, he picked the single black suit out of a closet of white ones and ordered that the rest be burned. Also during the first episode, an assistant was hammering the bell at the top of the tower, shouting "The plane! The plane!" Mr. Roarke then ordered the assistant to not do that again with such enthusiasm.

Episodes of the revived series regularly opened and ended with a sequence set in a travel agency that actually books the fantasies, operated by two elderly travel agents played by Fyvush Finkel and Sylvia Sidney (in her final acting role). Roarke gave them their assignments by stuffing contracts into a pneumatic tube that somehow connected the island with the travel agency and the outside world.

== Characters ==
- Mr. Roarke (Malcolm McDowell) – The enigmatic host and self-proclaimed "Master of Ceremonies" of Fantasy Island. Capable of working miracles and performing the impossible, he would bring people to the island under the pretense of fulfilling their deepest fantasy. However, ultimately his actions would lead to them receiving what their hearts really wanted or even showing them the error of their ways. While Roarke nearly always had the best intentions for his guests, he possessed a dark sense of humor and a dry wit with sarcastic undertones. Episode 10 revealed that he has an adopted daughter, Miranda, that was the only survivor of a shipwreck near the island. She left the island to live in the outside world after she turned 18. She became a doctor and eventually married, but retained no memories of Fantasy Island or of Roarke while she was off of the island.
- Ariel (Mädchen Amick) — Roarke's second-in-command. While she is incredibly old, physically she appears to be a young woman and has the ability to shapeshift into various women to help guests' fantasies along. She is quite fond of Roarke and appears to have been romantically involved with him sometime in the past. She claims to have been with as many men as there are grains in a fistful of sand. In episode 9, it is hinted at that she may be a djinni: she expresses displeasure when a guest calls for a particular fantasy (she says, "You know how I feel about bottles" when presented with one that resembles the one from I Dream of Jeannie, and the scene closes with a clip played of that TV show's theme song).
- Cal (Louis Lombardi) — While primarily introduced as the island's bellhop, he was also shown to have various other duties such as bartender, waiter, cook, and even helicopter pilot. In his former life, he was a small-time criminal. In episode 11, he is given a chance to start life anew at the age of 10 and leaves the island.
- Harry (Edward Hibbert) — The island hotel's concierge. He was apparently the concierge of a burning hotel from which Roarke rescued him.
- Fisher (Fyvush Finkel) — A travel agent who arranges trips to Fantasy Island at the start of each episode; he doesn't like being stuck at the agency while Roarke is on the island and hopes to one day replace him.
- Clia (Sylvia Sidney) — Fisher's secretary at the travel agency.

== Episodes ==
No.	Title	Directed by	Written by	Original release date
1	"Pilot"	Michael Dinner	Chris Weitz, Paul Weitz	September 26, 1998
Two travel agents, Fisher and Clia, send a form with their client's ultimate fantasy through a pneumatic tube, across thousands of miles, to Mr. Roarke on Fantasy Island. Meanwhile, Roarke battles with his assistants, Cal and Harry, to prepare the island resort for a new batch of arriving guests: Matthew Ashby, who wishes he had married a different woman; Ricky Barnes, a daredevil looking for the ultimate challenge; and Jackie Martin, a law student battling for intellectual supremacy over her smarter sister, Regina.
2	"Superfriends"	Michael Dinner	Adam Horowitz, Edward Kitsis	October 3, 1998
In an effort to create a bond between an overworked father and his son, Roarke transforms banker Louis Burton into eight-year-old Max's favorite superhero. Although Max is impressed when Louis, as Dyno-man, stops a meteor from destroying Earth, Louis is just as overzealous in his work as a superhero as he was as a banker. Consequently, Max finds himself watching from the sidelines again. Meanwhile, to help two friends explore the possibilities of any unexplored romantic possibilities between them, Roarke offers Gina Williams a chance to meet her old friend, Doug Strickman, again for the first time. But Gina soon sees that without her influence as a friend, Doug has become a very different man from the one she knew.
3	"We're Not Worthy"	David Jones	Dean Batali, Rob Des Hotel	October 10, 1998
An insecure professor, convinced that she is ugly, has a wish to become beautiful; while a newlywed, Pete Collins, wants to find out if his bride really loves him, so he decides to read her mind.
4	"Dying to Dance"	Rick Rosenthal	Diane Frolov, Andrew Schneider	October 17, 1998
Nathan O'Neil, a horror writer obsessed with the occult, comes to Fantasy Island in hopes of seeing a ghost. Nathan gets more than he bargained for when the ghost starts running around in his skin. Jack Lee and his wife Doris come to fulfill Jack's fantasy of being a great baseball player. When Jack takes ill, Doris has the opportunity to have her wish granted — to dance like Ginger Rogers. Meanwhile, Cal and Harry make an attempt to escape on a boat that is washed up on shore, but Mr. Roarke has other plans for them.
5	"Secret Self"	Stephen Cragg	Mary A. Boyd	October 24, 1998
A bored housewife dreams of being a talk show host — but she is in for the shock of her life when she has to interview the man with whom she is having an affair. A nice guy wants to trade in his conscience to become more successful at work, but things go awry when he starts to sprout horns and become devilish. Meanwhile, Ariel blows her top when she finds that Harry keeps eliminating the lilies from all her flower arrangements.
6	"Estrogen"	Gilbert Adler	Randall A. Anderson	October 31, 1998
Stan Rawlings and his married friend Dave arrive on the Island to chase girls, and Stan asks Roarke to help him learn the secrets of the female mystique. Stan gets transformed into a woman, "Brenda," and Ariel provides "him" with tips. Mary Wilcox, the descendant of male soldiers, comes to the island to fulfill her wish to become a soldier. Roarke puts her into an alternate World War II fought by women. Forced to choose between fighting and helping a wounded comrade, Mary helps the injured soldier instead.
7	"Dreams"	Perry Lang	Vivienne Radkoff	November 7, 1998
A man falls in love with a woman — who is really a dolphin. A bookish teenage boy wants to know what it is like to be with the in crowd, and his fantasies of being a great football player result in dire consequences. Meanwhile, Ariel's foul mood erupts when she thinks that no one remembered her birthday.
8	"Handymen"	Randall Zisk	Adam Horowitz, Edward Kitsis	December 12, 1998
Germophobic Kenny comes to the Island to live in a germ-free environment. However, a woman, Brigid, crashes into his habitat and he is forced to go with her to escape her pursuers; they soon find themselves in the jungle looking for an ancient mask. Jerry complains about his girlfriend leaving him on the island and Roarke puts him in a victims' support group. Faced with a bunch of other complainers, Jerry eventually learns to take responsibility for his own screwed-up life and leaves the island a happier man.
9	"Wishboned"	Deran Sarafian	Dean Batali, Rob Des Hotel	December 19, 1998
Ashley brings her boyfriend Joe to the island to show him a perfect family holiday - where she finds her own family there transformed into her "perfect" family. However, Joe soon starts to fall in love with Ashley's "perfect" sister. Disgruntled businessman Mike wishes to be sent back to rescue Katherine from her ogre of a husband in his childhood fantasy world - but the ogre looks just like Mike. Mike then realizes that that is how he acts to his own wife. Fred wants to have a genie who grants him three wishes and Roarke gives Ariel the assignment. She sabotages his first two wishes by interpreting them literally and goads Fred into wishing that "he could do a better job" and thus becoming a genie himself.
10	"Let Go"	Rick Wallace	Quartz MacKenzie	December 26, 1998
Roarke's daughter Miranda, who was allowed to leave the island but whose memory of it was erased, was in an accident, so he brings her back. Ariel, however, is concerned about how this will affect Roarke and the island. So while he takes care of Miranda, he lets Cal and Harry take care of their guest, a man named Ray who is obsessed with getting revenge on the thief who stole his classic Corvette. It turns out that Ray's wife Tina is the one responsible.
11	"Innocent"	Deran Sarafian	Ed Zuckerman	January 9, 1999
A lawyer who is tired of defending people who are guilty wants to defend someone who is actually innocent. So he comes to the island — and finds himself charged with a crime. A woman wishes to regain her virginity after losing it not in the way she wanted. Cal meets a young boy who is a problem child and he encourages the boy to do something wrong.
12	"The Real Thing"	Rick Wallace	Adam Horowitz, Edward Kitsis	January 16, 1999
Magazine editor Heather wants to marry Ben, who is marrying Heather's best friend Jenny. She arrives at Ben and Jenny's first date and interrupts them so she is engaged to Ben. But Heather soon realizes that Jenny is the one who should get married and calls the wedding off before it is too late. Carl wants to become the heavyweight champion of the world, but discovers his wife loves him as he was; Carl wins his first fight, but throws the second one to get his wife back. An obnoxious tabloid reporter, Filner, comes to the island and tries to get the "true story" on Fantasy Island to write an expose; he almost succeeds until Roarke has him abducted by aliens.
13	"Heroes"	Perry Lang	Ed Zuckerman	January 23, 1999
Actors Dirk and Bobby come to the island to have a chance to be heroes as the stars of their former series, Hard Squad. They find themselves back on the set as their characters, except now they are fighting actual criminals, which is not as easy. They opt to "retire" when things get too tough, but come back when their former co-star Cassie gets kidnapped by the actor who played their informant on the show, who wants revenge for their poor treatment of him. Linda's fantasy is for her husband Jeremy, who insists that they have a son, to become pregnant. He and Roarke find themselves in a golf match with Linda and Ariel to see who will end up carrying the child.
