= Carl Gugasian =

American bank robber (born 1947)

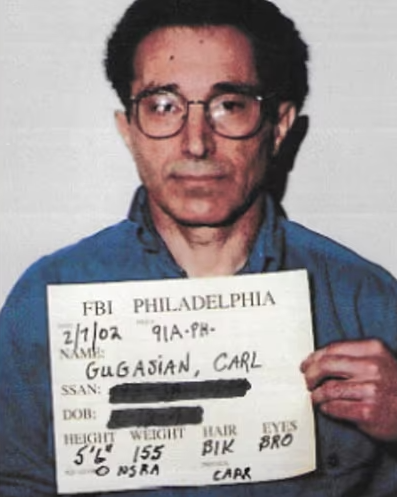
- Gugasian's FBI Mugshot
- Born: October 12, 1947 (age 79); Broomall, Pennsylvania
- Known for: "FBI's Most Prolific Bank Robber"

Carl Gugasian (born October 12, 1947) is an American bank robber, known as "The Friday Night Bank Robber", who served a 17-year sentence for armed robbery. He is perhaps the most prolific of such criminals in US history, having robbed more than 50 banks over a 30-year period of a total of more than $2 million.

== Early life ==
Gugasian was born October 12, 1947, in Broomall, Pennsylvania. At the age of 15, he was shot while attempting to rob a candy store and was sent to the State Youth Facility in Camp Hill, Pennsylvania (present-day SCI Camp Hill) for eighteen months. On his release in 1964, he did not attempt to live a normal life; rather, he took deliberate steps to continue with a life of crime and to excel in it. This decision was, in all likelihood, the result of a misunderstanding. FBI agent Ray Carr remarks, "He didn’t know that juvenile records get expunged. He thought he’d never be able to get a real job." However, he did enjoy the art of ballroom dancing and even did it a few times a week.

In 1971, he was studying for a Bachelor's degree in electrical engineering at Villanova University when he enrolled in the Reserve Officers' Training Corps. Following graduation, he served in the US Army at Fort Bragg. He later returned to college, earning a Master's degree in systems analysis from the University of Pennsylvania, followed by doctoral work in statistics and probability at Pennsylvania State University. After graduation, he began to plan out mock bank robberies. He planned eight in detail, but hesitated to carry them out. Eventually he committed his first robbery in North Carolina in 1973, using a stolen car as his getaway.

== The bank robberies ==
Gugasian's robberies were meticulously planned and executed. Using topographical and street maps, he selected small town banks which were next to wooded areas by nearby highway on-ramps. He would observe the target from the woods for several days to glean insight on employee behavior, waiting to strike in autumn or winter for earlier darkness. He would then create a cache to stash the money and his equipment immediately following the robbery.

He carried out the robberies on Friday nights just before closing time, believing this minimized the number of customers present and maximized the cash on hand. Characteristically he wore a frightening face mask (such as a character from a horror film), making sure it fit snugly to hide the color of his skin, and wore bulky clothes to hide his build. Entering the bank carrying a pistol, he moved in a "crab-like" manner to confuse estimates of his height. He would vault the counter in a standing jump, landing with a frightening crash, then stuff his bag with money and leave quickly, usually after less than two minutes in all.

Wearing a scent block to disguise his trail, he would run into woods, stash the evidence in his cache, then ride a dirt bike through the woods to a plain panel van on the other side, where he would load the bike into the van and get immediately onto the freeway.

On one occasion a startled bank manager leaned toward Gugasian, who shot him in the abdomen.

During his robbery of a Fulton Bank in Susquehanna Township, Dauphin County, Pennsylvania on February 19, 1981, Gugasian shot responding police officer Sgt. Robert "Bo" McCallister, who died in 2019 from complications from the shooting injury. Consequently, the death was ruled a homicide and Gugasian was named the suspect. Although the statute of limitations has expired for the shooting, investigators hope to draw a confession from Gugasian.

== Capture and incarceration ==
Gugasian had hidden the plans and equipment for his robberies (maps, face masks, food, weapons, ammunition) sealed in PVC pipes hidden in a concrete drainage pipe; these were found by two boys playing in the woods in Radnor, Pennsylvania. From this material police constructed a more accurate profile which led to Gugasian's arrest in 2002.

Gugasian's extensive cooperation after his arrest resulted in his initial 115-year sentence being reduced to seventeen years. In prison he taught mathematics to other inmates. He was released on May 5, 2017, at the age of 69. (Note: https://www.bop.gov/inmateloc/)

== In popular culture ==
- The Investigation Discovery Documentary Series “The Bureau“ Season 1 episode 12 episode “The Hunted“ is about Carl Gugasian.
- The method that the main characters in the film The Place Beyond the Pines use to rob banks was the actual method that Carl Gugasian used.
- An episode of the Canadian True Crime Documentary Series Masterminds about Carl titled the Friday Night Bank Robber was produced.
- In 2013, a short film based on Carl Gugasian titled “The Friday Night Bank Robber” directed by Austin Brink was released.
