= The Old Man & the Gun =

2018 film by David Lowery

- Theatrical release poster
- Directed by: David Lowery
- Written by: David Lowery
- Based on: "The Old Man and the Gun" by David Grann
- Produced by: James D. Stern; Dawn Ostroff; Jeremy Steckler; Anthony Mastromauro; Bill Holderman; Toby Halbrooks; James M. Johnston; Robert Redford
- Starring: Robert Redford; Casey Affleck; Danny Glover; Tika Sumpter; Tom Waits; Sissy Spacek
- Cinematography: Joe Anderson
- Edited by: Lisa Zeno Churgin
- Music by: Daniel Hart
- Production companies: Endgame Entertainment; Rocket Science; CNE; Sailor Bear; Identity Films; Tango Productions; Wildwood Enterprises
- Distributed by: Fox Searchlight Pictures
- Release dates: August 31, 2018 (Telluride); September 28, 2018 (United States)
- Running time: 93 minutes
- Country: United States
- Language: English
- Budget: $15.8 million
- Box office: $17.9 million

The Old Man & the Gun is a 2018 American biographical (Note: The film's opening states the story is "mostly true".) crime film written and directed by David Lowery, about Forrest Tucker, a career criminal and prison escape artist. The script is loosely based on David Grann's 2003 article in The New Yorker titled "The Old Man and the Gun", which was later collected in Grann's 2010 book The Devil and Sherlock Holmes. The film stars Robert Redford, Casey Affleck, Danny Glover, Tika Sumpter, Tom Waits and Sissy Spacek. Redford, then 82 years old, announced his intention to retire from acting after completion of the film. Redford's brief appearance in Avengers: Endgame (2019) was filmed before he made The Old Man & the Gun. It was his final filmed movie role before his death in 2025.

The film had its world premiere at the Telluride Film Festival on August 31, 2018, and was theatrically released in the United States by Fox Searchlight Pictures on September 28, 2018. It received mostly positive reviews from critics, and Redford was nominated for Best Actor – Motion Picture Musical or Comedy at the 76th Golden Globe Awards.

== Plot ==
Career criminal Forrest Tucker, a wanted man for two years since his daring escape from San Quentin State Prison in 1979, has just robbed another bank. While evading police, the 74-year-old charmer passes Jewel, a woman on the side of the road with car trouble and stops to give the appearance of assisting. The ploy works as, moments later, the police drive by without noticing him. Jewel is grateful for his help, and buys Forrest lunch at a diner. Despite introducing himself with a fake name, Forrest becomes drawn to Jewel to the point of revealing that he is a bank robber, although he then says it was a joke. The two later spend time together on Jewel's farm where Forrest becomes enamored of her and her life. Forrest makes a plan to pay off the rest of Jewel's mortgage as a surprise, but becomes frustrated after the bank tells him that this would require Jewel's signature on some documents, negating any surprise.

Forrest goes on to conduct a string of heists, often without having to draw his gun from under his coat. Dallas Police Detective John Hunt compiles police sketches from witnesses, who describe Forrest as charming and gentlemanly. John then displays the sketches on the evening news, asking anyone with information to come forward. Shortly afterward, John's investigation is taken over by the FBI.

A woman named Dorothy comes forward stating that she is Forrest's daughter. Although he is no longer on the case, John agrees to meet with her. Dorothy says she was born while Forrest was in prison, making him unaware of her or his grandchild. John then talks to Forrest's former lawyer, who says he would not be surprised if Forrest had never pulled the trigger of his gun. According to the lawyer, police reports of Forrest firing during a standoff are false, as it was simply his car's engine backfiring. Later, during a night out with Jewel, Forrest happens to recognize John, who is with his wife Maureen. Forrest tries to boost John's confidence, but becomes unnerved when John calls him by his name, indicating the recognition is mutual.

Later that evening, police attempt to capture Forrest as he arrives home. He flees, but again his car backfires, prompting police to shoot at him, striking him in the arm. He eludes them and makes his way to Jewel's farm. As he arrives in the early hours of the morning, he decides not to wake Jewel and instead takes one of her horses for a ride. Forrest had never ridden a horse before, and this was on his list of things he wanted to do. While riding, several police vehicles come down the road and turn onto Jewel's property. Forrest resigns himself to surrendering and does so. When Jewel visits him in prison, Forrest gives her a list of his sixteen previous escapes from reformatories and prisons, along with a number seventeen, which is blank. On Jewel's advice, he does not try to escape this time and remains incarcerated until the end of his sentence.

When Forrest is released from prison, Jewel is there to pick him up. She takes him to her farm and sets up a room for him, telling him that he can stay as long as he likes. They live a quiet life for a time, but Forrest becomes restless, and one day he tells Jewel that he is going out on an errand. He calls John from a payphone, and, when John asks if he is alright, Forrest says he is "about to be" and hangs up before walking into a bank across the street. Title cards appear that state: "Forrest Tucker robbed four more banks that day. When he was finally caught, the officers on the scene noted that as they arrested him... he was smiling."

== Cast ==
- Robert Redford as Forrest Tucker
- Casey Affleck as Detective John Hunt
- Sissy Spacek as Jewel, a widow who begins a relationship with Forrest
- Danny Glover as Teddy Green, one of Forrest's accomplices
- Tom Waits as Waller, one of Forrest's accomplices
- Tika Sumpter as Maureen Hunt, John's wife
- Ari Elizabeth Johnson as Abilene Hunt, John and Maureen's daughter
- Teagan Johnson as Tyler Hunt, John and Maureen's son
- Gene Jones as Mr. Owens, the manager of Three Day Bank
- John David Washington as Lieutenant Kelley, John's partner
- Barlow Jacobs as Detective Offerman, a coworker who gives John a hard time
- Elisabeth Moss as Dorothy, Forrest's daughter
- Keith Carradine as Captain Calder, John's supervisor
- Robert Longstreet as Stephen Beckley Jr., Esq., a lawyer who once represented Forrest

Lowery's wife, filmmaker and actress Augustine Frizzell, plays the small role of Sandy, the woman whose car Forrest steals; Frizzell had played a similar part in Lowery's 2013 film Ain't Them Bodies Saints. Isiah Whitlock, Jr. appears as Detective Gene Dentler, who gives John some information about the case; Whitlock had played a character named Sheriff Gene Dentler in Lowery's 2016 film Pete's Dragon. John Wayne Hunt, the inspiration for Affleck's character, has a cameo in the film as Trustee Jim, an inmate at San Quentin State Prison.

== Production ==
In October 2016, it was announced that Robert Redford and Casey Affleck were slated to star in the film, which David Lowery would direct from his script. James D. Stern, Jeremy Steckler, Dawn Ostroff, Redford, Anthony Mastromauro, and Bill Holderman were set to serve as producers under their Endgame Entertainment and Condé Nast banners, respectively, and Rocket Science was said to be handling international sales. Tika Sumpter, Sissy Spacek, Danny Glover, Tom Waits, Elisabeth Moss, and Isiah Whitlock, Jr. joined the cast of the film in March 2017, and the casting of Keith Carradine was announced the following month.

The film was shot on Super 16 mm film. Principal photography began in Dayton, Ohio, on April 3, 2017. Several scenes were also shot on location in Fort Worth, Texas, to give the film an “authentically Texan” atmosphere, according to Lowery. Filming also took place in Cincinnati and Bethel, Ohio; Bellmead and Waco, Texas; and Newport, Kentucky.

Daniel Hart, who had worked with writer/director Lowery on three previous films, composed the film's score. A soundtrack album featuring his music, along with some of the other songs featured in the film, was released on Varese Sarabande Records.

== Release ==
In March 2017, Fox Searchlight Pictures acquired distribution rights to the film in the US and UK. It had its world premiere at the Telluride Film Festival on August 31, 2018, and was screened at the Toronto International Film Festival on September 10. The film was scheduled to be released on October 5, 2018, but it was pushed up to September 28.

=== Home media ===
20th Century Fox Home Entertainment released the film in the United States for digital download on January 1, 2019, and on DVD and Blu-ray on January 15. It was made available via digital download, VOD, and DVD in the UK on April 1. The DVD and Blu-ray releases have eight special features, which include deleted scenes, an audio commentary by Lowery, behind-the-scenes footage, and a conversation about filmmaking between Redford and Lowery.

== Reception ==
=== Box office ===
The film was given a limited release in North America on September 28, 2018, and a wide release October 9, and it grossed a total of $11.3 million in the territory. It was released on December 7, 2018, in the United Kingdom, where it grossed $791,192, and on December 20, 2018, in Italy, where it grossed $1.4 million.

=== Critical response ===
On review aggregator website Rotten Tomatoes, the film has an approval rating of 93% based on 270 reviews, with an average rating of 7.6/10; the site's "critics consensus" reads: "A well-told story brought to life by a beautifully matched cast, The Old Man & the Gun is pure, easygoing entertainment for film fans—and a fitting farewell to a legend." On Metacritic, the film has a weighted average score of 80 out of 100, based on 49 critics, indicating "generally favorable reviews".

Clint Worthington of Consequence of Sound gave the film a "B+" grade, saying: "Just like Tucker can't help but chase the thrill of an outlaw's life, so too the audience gets hooked on Redford's effortless presence, and the airy, ethereal joys the film presents." Todd McCarthy of The Hollywood Reporter wrote: "The film makes plenty of mileage from trading on the charm of a good bad boy, and Redford's long experience in playing such roles serves him beautifully here; he knows by now he doesn't have to push his attractiveness to be ingratiating." Peter Debruge of Variety described the film as "a reminder of everything Redford has given us over the years," and Eric Kohn of IndieWire gave the film a "B+" grade, saying: "Ultimately, the movie is a giant, lovable metaphor: Tucker's criminal preoccupations are such a natural part of his life he seems as if he could keep at it forever, no matter the impracticalities, and he becomes an ideal avatar for Redford's own achievements."

=== Accolades ===
Award	Date of Ceremony	Category	Recipient(s)	Result	Ref.
AARP Movies for Grownups Awards	February 4, 2019	Best Grownup Love Story	The Old Man & the Gun	Nominated	
AARP Movies for Grownups Awards	February 4, 2019	Best Actor	Robert Redford	Nominated	
Alliance of Women Film Journalists	January 10, 2019	Actress Defying Age and Ageism	Sissy Spacek	Nominated	
Dublin Film Critics' Circle	December 20, 2018	Best Cinematography	Joe Anderson	6th place	
Golden Globe Awards	January 6, 2019	Best Actor in a Motion Picture - Musical or Comedy	Robert Redford	Nominated	
National Board of Review	January 8, 2019	Top Ten Independent Films	The Old Man & the Gun	Won	
Satellite Awards	February 17, 2019	Best Actor in a Motion Picture, Drama	Robert Redford	Nominated	
