= Finding Steve McQueen =

2019 heist film

- Theatrical release poster
- Directed by: Mark Steven Johnson
- Written by: Ken Hixon; Keith Sharon
- Produced by: Anthony Mastromauro; Silvio Muraglia; Alexandra Klim; Andrea Iervolino
- Starring: Travis Fimmel; Rachael Taylor; William Fichtner; Lily Rabe; Rhys Coiro; Forest Whitaker
- Cinematography: José David Montero
- Edited by: Julia Juaniz; Kathryn Himoff
- Music by: Victor Reyes
- Production companies: Paradox Studios; Identity Films; AMBI Media Group
- Distributed by: Momentum Pictures
- Release date: March 15, 2019 (United States)
- Running time: 91 minutes
- Country: United States
- Language: English
- Box office: $21,905

Finding Steve McQueen is a 2019 American heist thriller film directed by Mark Steven Johnson and written by Ken Hixon and Keith Sharon. The film stars Travis Fimmel, Rachael Taylor, Forest Whitaker, and William Fichtner, telling the story of a gang planning to steal millions of dollars from President Nixon's illegal political slush fund. It was released in the United States on March 15, 2019, by Momentum Pictures. The film is based on the United California Bank robbery.

== Plot ==
In 1980, Harry James Barber tells his story about the California bank burglary he committed eight years ago to his girlfriend Molly Murphy, whose relationship is under strain after discovering his secret.

In 1972, Harry lives above a refurbished theater house in Pennsylvania and is a big fan of actor Steve McQueen. Harry had agreed to the plan led by the handler Enzo Rotella of burglarizing the bank supposedly containing the illegal slush fund of President Richard Nixon. The team is joined by Paul Callahan, Raymond Darrow, and Harry's brother Tommy Barber – a Vietnam War veteran.

The gang travels to California and rents a vacation house not far away from the bank. Harry meets the widow Molly Murphy at a bar, whose husband was killed in a vehicular accident. Harry and Molly happily develop their relationship, but he hides his secret about his scheme from Molly throughout the relationship. At night, the gang disables the alarm system, and enters the bank vault by blowing a hole into the vault roof with dynamite. After three days of burglary, they successfully loot about $9 million overall; however, Harry receives only $10,000, and the rest of the team go their separate ways. After the burglary, the bank job has become public knowledge and FBI agents Howard Lambert and Sharon Price take the case. After a thorough investigation, they eventually locate the vacation house linked to the job and manage to identify the culprits through fingerprints left on unwashed dishes and utensils. All members of the gang are subsequently arrested, except Harry who escapes.

In 1980, Harry tells Molly that he is done running from the law and he had called her father, a sheriff, to arrest him. As they get out from the diner, Howard and the local sheriffs arrive and Harry kisses her goodbye before being brought to the custody. The epilogue states that Harry was sentenced to seven years in prison but is reduced to three years after the letter from the Sheriff was signed by the townspeople to attest to Harry's character.

== Cast ==
- Travis Fimmel as Harry Barber
- Rachael Taylor as Molly Murphy
- William Fichtner as Enzo Rotella
- Forest Whitaker as Howard Lambert
- Lily Rabe as Sharon Price
- Louis Lombardi as Pauly Callahan
- Rhys Coiro as Ray Darrow
- Jake Weary as Tommy Barber
- John Finn as W. Mark Felt

== Production ==
Principal photography on the film began in early September 2016 in Atlanta, Georgia.

Several Tommy James songs are heard in the film.

Scenes were filmed in Dallas, Georgia in early October.

== Reception ==
=== Box office ===
Finding Steve McQueen grossed $21,950 at the box office.

=== Critical reception ===
On the review aggregator website Rotten Tomatoes, 46% of 28 critics' reviews are positive, with an average rating of 5.3/10. The website's consensus reads: "Finding Steve McQueen's title invites thoughts of old-school action classics, but this energetic heist picture is disappointingly thrill-deficient." Metacritic, which uses a weighted average, assigned the film a score of 53 out of 100, based on 10 critics, indicating "mixed or average" reviews.
