= Wesley Weber =

Canadian counterfeit banknote creator

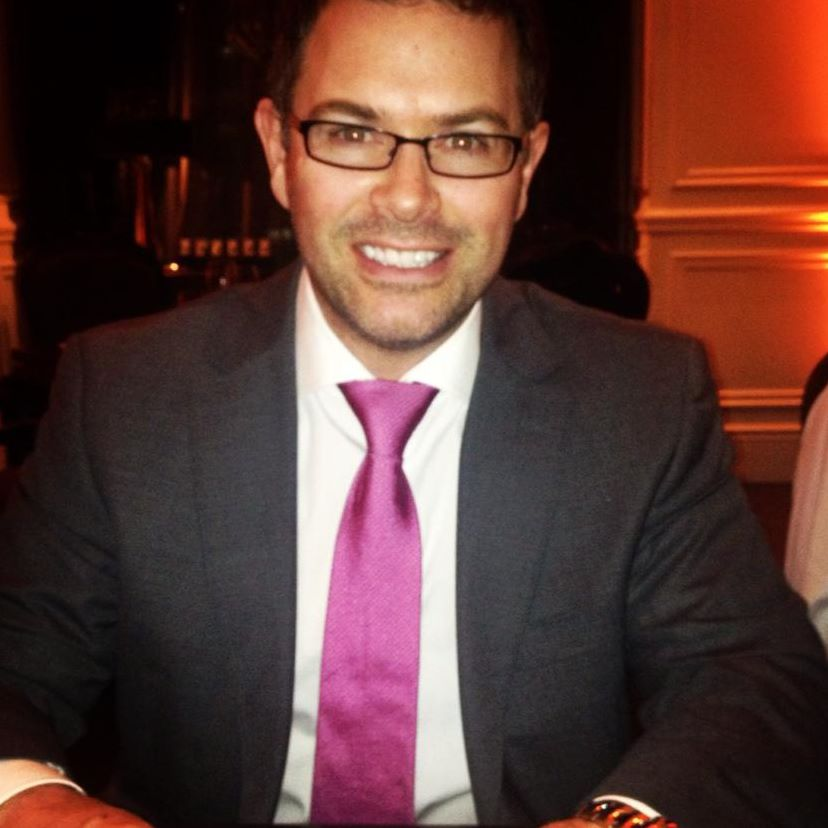
- Born: Ontario
- Other names: Wesley Kam, Jeff Murray.
- Criminal charges: Counterfeit banknotes and trading without registration

Wesley Wayne Weber is a Canadian who is considered one of the country's most prominent counterfeit banknote creators. Weber succeeded in counterfeiting the 1986 series Canadian hundred-dollar bill. They were the highest quality computer produced counterfeits of Canadian banknotes to date. Between ten and nineteen percent of retailers nationwide refused accepting 100 dollar bills as payment, due to the difficulty of identifying the fake copies. In 2006 the Canadian documentary series Masterminds featured an episode about him.

== Early life ==
Weber grew up in Amherstburg, a small town near Windsor, Ontario. During his high school years he considered himself a computer nerd and by the age of 13 he was able to produce his first fake bills. After high school, Weber started to study bioscience and took two years of mechanical engineering at the University of Windsor. Before finishing his degree he moved to Toronto and by the age of 26 he purchased a condominium, a Ferrari and various other luxury vehicles.

== Counterfeiting ==
During his teenage years Wesley Weber was able to forge all kind of documents, including insurance certificates, welfare cards, cheques and gift certificates. In 1997 he was sentenced to three months for forgery. After that, he spent weeks tinkering with scanned copies of banknotes to perfect the simulated images and security features using techniques he found on websites. He used editing software that allowed to enlarge the image up to 1000 times and printed more than 7.7 million dollars using an HP Deskjet printer. To emulate the security features of the real money, Weber used special paper that did not glow under UV light as well as custom foil to forge the metallic patch on the bills. He also purchased fluorescent paint to simulate another feature, the polymer UV responsive dots. He was arrested in October 2000 after a police raid into the building used to print the money, where they seized over a quarter million dollars in counterfeit bills. By November 2001, over 40 000 fake bills had been detected and taken out of circulation. Police started following Weber's trail after he used his 100 dollar counterfeit bills to pay for a three-thousand dollar purchase at an auto parts supplier. The year he was arrested, Canada changed their currency bills, introducing new security features to try to prevent counterfeiting. Weber pleaded guilty in August 2001, and received a five-year prison sentence. Weber was released from jail in August 2006 and moved to Richmond Hill, Ontario where he worked selling phones. In 2017, a report by the Bank of Canada cited Weber as one of the most well-known counterfeiters in the country.

== Trading ==
During his jail term Weber learned market trading and after release founded the consulting firm Goldbridge Financial Inc. which provided financial services without registration. Weber and his wife, Michelle Kam, co-founded the digital currency startup company Incryptex which provides a platform for trading and storing digital crypto-currencies. Weber used the alias 'Wesley Kam' to try to get the company listed on a public exchange by issuing shares and received funds from investors. In January 2019, Weber pleaded guilty to violating a 2011 trading ban from the Ontario Securities Commission for his activities in Incryptex. On 29 October 2019, he was sentenced for that offence to a prison term of 90 days, along with two years of probation by Justice Malcolm McLeod of the Ontario Court of Justice.

== Cannabis advocacy ==
Wesley Weber had been a marijuana farmer in the past. In April 1999 he got arrested for exploiting a grow op in the basement of his home in Windsor and again in 2010 for planting marijuana in another farmer's field. That year, he was sentenced to 18 months of house arrest and 240 hours of community service. In September 2017 Weber used the alias 'Jeff Murray' to speak in front of the city councilors at Toronto's Licensing and Standards Committee and gave his recommendations on how they should regulate cannabis establishments. In October 2018, the Cannabis Act legalized the use of marijuana for recreational purpose in Canada. Weber declared that he helped finance a chain of cannabis stores named CAFE and according to a CBC News investigation he was one of its founders and main owners. His wife served as director of a company that owns one of the properties used by CAFE. She was also the guarantor of a 1.7 million dollar loan on that real estate.
