= Identity Films =

American film production company

- Industry: Filmmaking
- Founded: 2006
- Headquarters: United States
- Key people: Anthony Mastromauro
- Website: identityfilm.com

Identity Films is a production company formed by Anthony Mastromauro in 2006. The company has most recently produced the upcoming independent coming-of-age drama As Cool As I Am, directed by Max Mayer, starring James Marsden, Claire Danes and Sarah Bolger, as well as Moonlight Serenade directed by Giancarlo Tallarico and starring Amy Adams, Alec Newman, and Harriet Sansom Harris, as well as Artie Lange's Beer League directed by Frank Sebastiano, co-starring Lange and Ralph Macchio.

== Filmography ==
- Beer League (2006)
- Moonlight Serenade (2009)
- As Cool As I Am (2012)
- Finding Steve McQueen (2017)
- The Old Man and the Gun (2018)
