= Artie Lange's Beer League =

2006 film by Frank Sebastiano

- Theatrical release poster
- Directed by: Frank Sebastiano
- Written by: Artie Lange; Frank Sebastiano
- Produced by: Artie Lange; Anthony Mastromauro
- Starring: Artie Lange; Ralph Macchio; Cara Buono; Laurie Metcalf; Anthony DeSando
- Cinematography: David Phillips
- Edited by: Peter Fandetti
- Music by: BC Smith
- Distributed by: Echo Bridge Entertainment
- Release date: September 15, 2006
- Running time: 86 minutes
- Language: English
- Budget: $2,800,000 (Estimate)
- Box office: $472,185

Artie Lange's Beer League (also known simply as Beer League) is a 2006 American comedy film written and produced by, and starring, Artie Lange. It was released in select theaters on September 15, 2006, in the New Jersey, New York, Cleveland and Philadelphia areas.

== Plot ==
Artie DeVanzo is an unemployed town drunk who plays softball with his buddies Maz and Johnny for Ed's Bar and Swill. Their arch-rival is Manganelli Fitness, led by Dennis Manganelli. After the teams brawl during the first game of the year, the town's police chief decides whichever team finishes best in the league that season can still play in the league, and whichever team loses is out for good.

Artie lives at home with his mother and can never hold a job or a girlfriend for very long. After a night out with his pals, he ends up at a diner for late night food, where he sees old flame Linda Salvo out with her friends. Artie abandons his friends and starts some small talk with Linda, which results in a one-night stand. At first Linda is disgusted and annoyed that she let herself fall into another meaningless encounter, but Artie decides to actually try to attempt a more meaningful relationship with her.

The Ed's team, traditionally a league doormat, decides to actually practice in an attempt to beat out Manganelli and stay in the league. The regular season is highlighted by Maz's bachelor party and wedding, and Johnny's attempt to bat .700 for the year.

The team charges up the standings to qualify for the championship game against the four-time defending champions from Manganelli Fitness. However, 'Dirt', Ed's Bar and Swill's team pitcher, collapses and dies from a heart attack at practice in the days leading up to the championship. After the funeral, the rest of the team drinks heavily in homage to Dirt before they play in the championship game scheduled for that afternoon.

Manganelli's team quickly builds a 10–0 lead over their inebriated opponents, and that remains the score heading into the final inning of the game. After two outs, the season rests on Artie's shoulders.

Artie proceeds to launch a Manganelli pitch over the fence in left field for a solo home run, a rare feat that nobody in the league has done "since '89". That shot only makes the score 10–1, but Ed's Bar and Swill comes to life and bats around the lineup in the inning, bringing Artie back to the plate, now with the bases loaded and the score 10–6, though still with two outs.

Artie hits the ball to right field, where nobody is stationed because Manganelli has his fielders playing the "DeVanzo Shift"; completely dead-pull. All three baserunners come home, and as the ball is thrown away, Artie races home in an attempt to tie the score. He and Manganelli have a collision at the plate, but Manganelli hangs on to the ball for the final out and a 10–9 victory.

After the game ends, Artie keeps his vow not to let Manganelli have the championship trophy, stealing it during the post-game awards ceremony and driving north on Route 120 past Giants Stadium, heading for the Jersey Shore with Linda, talking about other leagues in other towns and how he can still play in them.

== Cast ==
- Artie Lange as Artie DeVanzo
- Ralph Macchio as Maz
- Anthony DeSando as Dennis Manganelli
- Cara Buono as Linda Salvo
- Jimmy Palumbo as Johnny Trinno
- Joe Lo Truglio as Dave
- Jerry Minor as Tim
- Seymour Cassel as Dirt
- Michael Deeg as Alfonse
- Maddie Corman as Marilyn
- Matthew Gumley as Tommy
- Jim Florentine as Crispino
- Mary Birdsong as Rhonda
- Laurie Metcalf as Mrs. DeVanzo
- Louis Lombardi as Police Chief Gugliamino
- Jim Breuer as Football Guy
- Todd Barry as Creepy Guy down by the shore
- Tina Fey as Gym Secretary
- Keisha as "The Pitching Machine"
- Elizabeth Regen as Gina
- Nick DiPaolo as Cousin Mickey

== Reception ==
The film was a box-office failure. Figures from Box Office Mojo show the film was only released in 164 theaters for 14 days, with an opening weekend gross of $302,908, and a total domestic gross of $472,185.

On the review aggregator website Rotten Tomatoes, 31% of 13 critics' reviews are positive. Metacritic, which uses a weighted average, assigned the film a score of 40 out of 100, based on 6 critics, indicating "mixed or average" reviews.

Christopher Null of Filmcritic.com, called the film, "[A] whole lot of lewd potty humor that doesn't really add up to anything substantial, a guilty pleasure of sorts when taken in small bursts, but which grows somewhat tiresome in the long run". Richard Roeper gave it a positive review, saying, "Beer League is raunchy and tacky, but it's a hell of a lot funnier than something like Failure To Launch". Brian Orndorf of eFilmCritic.com gave it a positive review: "Beer League is not for tender ears, but more for the beer-bellied, rascally rule breaker in all of us, and most importantly, there's a great chance something in here will make you laugh".

Neil Genzlinger writing for The New York Times complained that it "somehow manages to make beer-league softball seem no fun at all in this extremely lowbrow comedy." and Variety critic Rob Koehler called it "Sloppy but unconcerned about it".

== See also ==
- List of baseball films
