= Pete Fromm =

American novelist

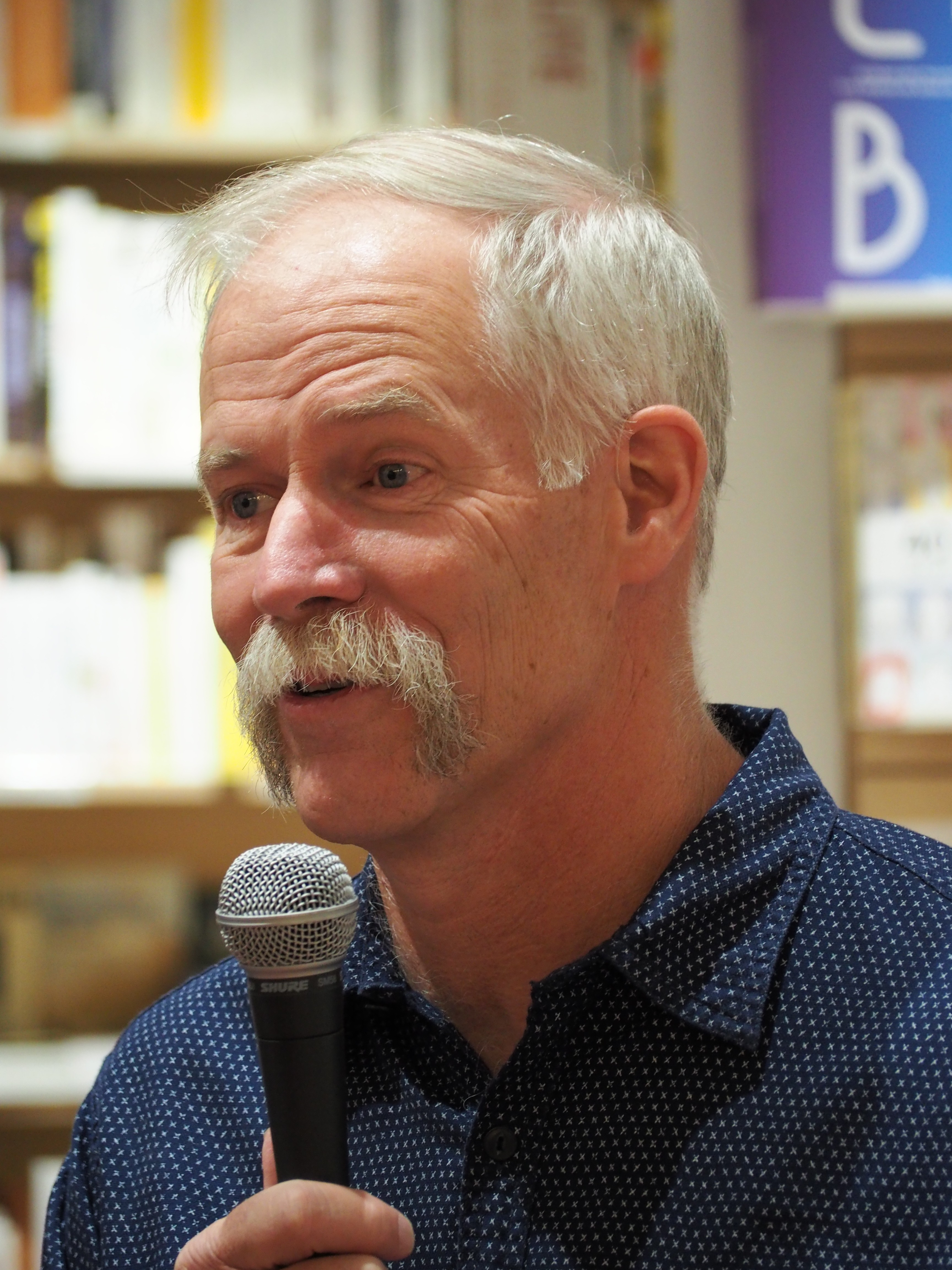
- Fromm in Paris, 2019
- Born: September 29, 1958 (age 68); Shorewood, Wisconsin, U.S.
- Education: University of Montana (BS)
- Occupations: Novelist; short story writer; memoirist

Pete Fromm (born September 29, 1958) is an American author of novels, short stories, and memoirs.

== Biography ==
Fromm was born in Shorewood, Wisconsin, and holds a B.S. in wildlife biology from the University of Montana where he graduated with honors in 1981. A five-time winner of the Pacific Northwest Booksellers Literary Award, he is the author of five short story collections, seven novels, and two memoirs. In 2007 he wrote the screenplay for the short film Dry Rain, based on his story of the same name, and in 2013 the film of his novel, As Cool As I Am, was released, starring Claire Danes, James Marsden, and Sarah Bolger. His latest novel in the U.S. was A Job You Mostly Won't Know How To Do, published in May 2019, and in September 2019 in France. His novel "Le Lac De Nulle Part" (Lake Nowhere) was published in France in January, 2022, and his novel, "Imperatrice Des Airs", (Empress of the Air) in May, 2025. He has been on the faculty of Pacific University's MFA in Writing program since 2005, and lives in Montana.

== Works ==
=== Novels ===
- Imperatrice Des Airs, 2025
- Le Lac De Nulle Part, 2022
- A Job You Mostly Won't Know How To Do, 2019
- If Not For This, 2014
- As Cool as I Am, 2003
- How All This Started, 2000
- Monkey Tag, 1994

=== Memoir ===
- Indian Creek Chronicles: A Winter in the Wilderness, 1993
- The Names of the Stars: A Life in the Wilds, 2017

=== Short Story collections ===
- The Tall Uncut, 1992
- King of the Mountain: Sporting Stories,1994
- Dry Rain, 1997
- Blood Knot, 1998
- Night Swimming, 1999

== Awards ==
Fromm has been awarded the Pacific Northwest Booksellers Association Award five times: in 1994 for the memoir Indian Creek Chronicles; in 1998 for the story collection Dry Rain; in 2001 for the novel, How All This Started: in 2004 for the novel As Cool As I Am, and in 2015 for the novel If Not For This.
