= As Cool as I Am =

2003 novel by Pete Fromm

- Author: Pete Fromm
- Language: English
- Genre: Novel
- Publisher: Picador
- Publication date: 2003
- Publication place: United States
- Media type: Print (hardback & paperback)
- ISBN: 0-312-30775-6

As Cool as I Am is a 2003 coming of age novel by American author Pete Fromm.

== Plot summary ==
The protagonist and narrator is Lucy, a self-confessed tomboy who is considered "one of the guys" with her masculine haircut and attitude. She gets on well with her father but is frequently separated from him for months on end when he works in Canada. Her relationship with her mother is easygoing, provided she keeps the house tidy. Her mother's lenience even allows her daughter to drive her car, even though she is too young to apply for a license.

As Lucy turns 14, she becomes more in tune with her sexuality and her family dynamics. She develops a friends-with-benefits relationship with her best friend Kenny. She also ditches her tomboy image, embraces make-up and grows out her hair. She begins to realize that her parents' marriage is not as solid as she had imagined. She realizes that her father's extended stays abroad are not typical of other fathers. Furthermore, she realizes that her mother does not pine for her father as much as she does herself. In fact, her allegiance to her father is tested when she discovers her mother is enjoying a romance with a colleague.

She pro-actively seeks sexual satisfaction after she is left with a void when Kenny has to move away. She also begins to realize that there is more to her father's extended stays in Canada than she had previously imagined.

== Reception ==
Publishers Weekly described the novel as "Spirited and sharply intelligent". The San Francisco Chronicle heaped praise in the work: "One of the more startling beautiful and evocative tales of young womanhood...Fromm's voice-on loan to Lucy-is provocative, gritty, erotic, hilarious and genuine, and this book is a fresh breath of teen spirit."

== Film adaptation ==
In May 2011, a film adaptation went into production in New Mexico, with Sarah Bolger, Claire Danes and James Marsden starring as Lucy and her parents, respectively. The film was released in the United States on June 21, 2013, by IFC Films.
