= Anthony Mastromauro =

American film producer (born 1968)

- Born: Antonio Mastromauro; 1968 (age 56–57); Hoboken, NJ
- Occupation: Film producer
- Website: www.identity-media.com

Antonio "Anthony" Mastromauro (born 1968) is an American film producer. He is the President and Founder of Identity Films an independent production company based out of Los Angeles, California.

Mastromauro's films include As Cool as I Am starring Sarah Bolger, Claire Danes, and James Marsden, as well as After the Fall and Black Butterfly.

Prior to working in the film industry, Mastromauro worked on Wall Street as the Senior Vice President for Oppenheimer Holdings.

== Filmography ==
He was a producer in all films unless otherwise noted.

=== Film ===
Year	Film	Credit	Notes
2004	King of the Corner	Co-producer	
2006	Artie Lange's Beer League		
2009	Moonlight Serenade		Direct-to-video
2013	As Cool as I Am		
2013	Louder Than Words		
2017	Black Butterfly	Executive producer	
2018	The Old Man & the Gun		
2019	Finding Steve McQueen		
TBA	After the Fall		

As an actor

Year	Film	Role	Notes
1999	The Storytellers	Agent #2	
2001	Joe Dirt	Painter	
2002	After Freedom	Gas Station Owner	
2015	Entourage	Dom's Cell Mate	Uncredited

Thanks

Year	Film	Role
2020	She's in Portland	Additional thanks

=== Television ===
Year	Title	Credit
2021	Paradise City	Co-executive producer
