= United California Bank burglary =

1972 heist in Laguna Niguel, California

The United California Bank burglary took place on 27 March 1972, when the safe deposit vault at United California Bank in Laguna Niguel, California, was broken into and US$9 million (equivalent to $69.3 million in 2025) in cash and valuables were looted by professional burglars led by Amil Dinsio.

== The crime ==
The gang gained entry to the vault by using dynamite to blast a hole in its reinforced concrete roof.

Dinsio's accomplices were his brother, James Dinsio, his nephews Harry and Ronald Barber, his brother-in-law Charles Mulligan, alarm expert Phil Christopher, and Charles Broeckel. The Dinsio crew was from Youngstown, Ohio and Christopher and Broeckel were from Cleveland. Amil Dinsio was the mastermind of the operation but he worked closely with his brother James, an explosives expert and designer/fabricator of burglary tools. Dinsio's brother-in-law, Charles Mulligan, was the driver and look-out man. The inclusion of Phil Christopher and Charles Broeckel was forced upon Dinsio by the person who clued him in on the score. Dinsio reluctantly took Broeckel along as muscle only, which proved to be a critical mistake. He had no skills needed to assist in any other way with the crime as he was nothing more than a petty thief. Broeckel helped inside the vault to bust open safe deposit boxes. Christopher played a key role in disarming the alarm. The total stolen was estimated at nearly $9 million.

== Investigation and arrests ==
While the burglary itself was executed without leaving evidence that could lead to the perpetrators, the thieves perpetrated a similar crime in Ohio a few months later. The FBI linked the two burglaries, and their investigation of transportation records revealed that five of the gang members had travelled to California on a single flight using their own names. A sixth man, James Dinsio, arrived on a separate flight the day before the crime. They also learned of the townhouse used as a HQ, which had been rented by the Barber brothers. A search initially found nothing, until the dishwasher was checked. The burglars had forgotten to run the dishwasher before returning to Ohio, and the recovered fingerprints permitted federal arrest warrants to be issued. This led to the arrest and conviction of all the burglars, along with recovering only some of the money.

== Trial and witness tampering ==
Earl Dawson, who assisted the police and testified against the gang, was offered money by his brother Harold Dawson to influence his testimony. Earl Dawson was placed in the witness protection program as was Charles Broeckel, who testified against his co-conspirators in exchange for immunity from prosecution.

== In popular culture ==
The 2000 book, Robbing Banks: An American History, 1831-1999, dedicates a section to Amil Dinsio leading his crew on the United California Bank burglary. Amil Dinsio's book, Inside The Vault, was self-published in 2014 with the assistance of his daughter. The 2006 book Superthief: A Master Burglar, the Mafia, and the Great California Bank Heist, focuses on Dinsio crew member Phil Christopher's knowledge of alarm systems and his role in the planning and execution of the burglary.

Accounts of the burglary and investigation have been shown on truTV and Investigation Discovery. The incident is used as the basis of the 2019 feature film Finding Steve McQueen, focusing on Harry Barber, Dinsio's nephew and crew member. The 2021 documentary film Superthief, focuses on Christopher. ‘All the President’s Money,’ the 2021 premiere of NBC's Super Heists, featured the United California burglary, with Amil Dinsio recounting his story that the bank was targeted to recoup contributions from Jimmy Hoffa to the 1972 Nixon campaign by stealing a slush fund. Dinsio was portrayed by Bill Allen, and FBI agent Frank Calley was portrayed by Shawn Hatfield.

== See also ==
- List of large value US robberies
