= List of awards and nominations received by Casey Affleck =

Casey Affleck awards and nominations
- Affleck at the 2026 Venice Film Festival
Awards and nominations
Award	Wins	Nominations
Academy Awards	1	2
Actor Awards	1	4
British Academy Film Awards	1	1
Critics' Choice Awards	2	5
Golden Globes	1	2

Totals (Note: Certain award groups do not simply award one winner. They acknowledge several different recipients, have runners-up, and have third place. Since this is a specific recognition and is different from losing an award, runner-up mentions are considered wins in this award tally. For simplification and to avoid errors, each award in this list has been presumed to have had a prior nomination.)
- Wins: 60
- Nominations: 98

Casey Affleck is an American actor and director who has received numerous accolades throughout his career.

Affleck's breakthrough came in 2007, when he starred as the American outlaw Robert Ford in the Western drama The Assassination of Jesse James by the Coward Robert Ford, for which he received nominations for Best Supporting Actor at the Academy Awards, Actor Awards, and Golden Globe Awards. In the same year, he also had a leading role in his brother Ben Affleck's directorial debut Gone Baby Gone, that earned him a nomination for the Critics' Choice Movie Award for Best Acting Ensemble.

Affleck received universal acclaim for his portrayal of Lee Chandler, a grief-stricken alcoholic loner, in Kenneth Lonergan's drama film Manchester by the Sea (2016). His performance won him the Academy Award for Best Actor, as well as the corresponding prize at the British Academy Film Awards (BAFTA), Critics' Choice Movie Awards, and Golden Globe Awards. He won his first Actor Award as part of the ensemble of Christopher Nolan's epic thriller Oppenheimer (2023).

Affleck has also directed the mockumentary I'm Still Here (2010) starring Joaquin Phoenix and the drama film Light of My Life (2019), the former of which was honored at the Venice Film Festival.

== Major associations ==
=== Academy Awards ===
Year	Category	Nominated work	Result	Ref.
2008	Best Supporting Actor	The Assassination of Jesse James by the Coward Robert Ford	Nominated	
2017	Best Actor	Manchester by the Sea	Won	

=== Actor Awards ===
Year	Category	Nominated work	Result	Ref.
2008	Outstanding Performance by a Male Actor in a Supporting Role	The Assassination of Jesse James by the Coward Robert Ford	Nominated	
2017	Outstanding Performance by a Male Actor in a Leading Role	Manchester by the Sea	Nominated	
2017	Outstanding Performance by a Cast in a Motion Picture (Note: Shared with the cast.)	Manchester by the Sea	Nominated	
2024	Outstanding Performance by a Cast in a Motion Picture	Oppenheimer	Won	

=== British Academy Film Awards ===
Year	Category	Nominated work	Result	Ref.
2017	Best Actor in a Leading Role	Manchester by the Sea	Won	

=== Critics' Choice Awards ===
Year	Category	Nominated work	Result	Ref.
2008	Best Supporting Actor	The Assassination of Jesse James by the Coward Robert Ford	Nominated	
2008	Best Acting Ensemble	Gone Baby Gone	Nominated	
2016	Best Actor	Manchester by the Sea	Won	
2016	Best Acting Ensemble	Manchester by the Sea	Nominated	
2024	Best Acting Ensemble	Oppenheimer	Won	

=== Golden Globes ===
Year	Category	Nominated work	Result	Ref.
2008	Best Supporting Actor – Motion Picture	The Assassination of Jesse James by the Coward Robert Ford	Nominated	
2017	Best Actor in a Motion Picture – Drama	Manchester by the Sea	Won	

== Minor associations ==
=== AACTA International Awards ===
Year	Category	Nominated work	Result	Ref.
2017	Best Actor	Manchester by the Sea	Won	

=== Chlotrudis Awards ===
Year	Category	Nominated work	Result	Ref.
2008	Best Actor	The Assassination of Jesse James by the Coward Robert Ford	Nominated	
2017	Best Actor	Manchester by the Sea	Nominated	

=== Dorian Awards ===
Year	Category	Nominated work	Result	Ref.
2017	Film Performance of the Year – Actor	Manchester by the Sea	Nominated	

=== Empire Awards ===
Year	Category	Nominated work	Result	Ref.
2017	Best Actor	Manchester by the Sea	Nominated	

=== Film Independent Spirit Awards ===
Year	Category	Nominated work	Result	Ref.
2017	Best Male Lead	Manchester by the Sea	Won	

=== Gotham Awards ===
Year	Category	Nominated work	Result	Ref.
2016	Best Actor	Manchester by the Sea	Won	

=== Hollywood Film Awards ===
Year	Category	Nominated work	Result	Ref.
2007	Breakthrough Actor of the Year	Himself	Won	

=== Irish Film and Television Awards ===
Year	Category	Nominated work	Result	Ref.
2009	Best International Actor	Gone Baby Gone	Nominated	
2017	Best International Actor	Manchester by the Sea	Won	

=== Jupiter Awards ===
Year	Category	Nominated work	Result	Ref.
2017	Best International Actor	Triple 9	Nominated	

=== MTV Movie & TV Awards ===
Year	Category	Nominated work	Result	Ref.
2002	Best On-Screen Team	Ocean's Eleven	Nominated	

=== Sant Jordi Awards ===
Year	Category	Nominated work	Result	Ref.
2018	Best Actor in a Foreign Film	Manchester by the Sea	Nominated	

=== Satellite Awards ===
Year	Category	Nominated work	Result	Ref.
2007	Best Supporting Actor – Motion Picture	The Assassination of Jesse James by the Coward Robert Ford	Won (Note: Tied with Tom Wilkinson for Michael Clayton)	
2014	Best Supporting Actor – Motion Picture	Out of the Furnace	Nominated	
2017	Best Actor – Motion Picture	Manchester by the Sea	Nominated	
2024	Best Cast – Motion Picture	Oppenheimer	Won	

=== Teen Choice Awards ===
Year	Category	Nominated work	Result	Ref.
2007	Choice Movie: Chemistry	Ocean's Thirteen	Nominated	

== Critics associations ==
Year	Nominated work	Association	Category	Result	Ref.
2007	The Assassination of Jesse James by the Coward Robert Ford	Alliance of Women Film Journalists	Best Supporting Actor	Nominated	
2007	The Assassination of Jesse James by the Coward Robert Ford	Chicago Film Critics Association	Best Supporting Actor	Nominated	
2007	The Assassination of Jesse James by the Coward Robert Ford	Dallas–Fort Worth Film Critics Association	Best Supporting Actor	Runner-up	
2007	The Assassination of Jesse James by the Coward Robert Ford	Detroit Film Critics Society	Best Supporting Actor	Nominated	
2007	The Assassination of Jesse James by the Coward Robert Ford	Dublin Film Critics' Circle	Best Actor	Nominated	
2007	The Assassination of Jesse James by the Coward Robert Ford	IndieWire Critics Poll	Best Supporting Performance	Nominated	
2007	The Assassination of Jesse James by the Coward Robert Ford	National Board of Review	Best Supporting Actor	Won	
2007	The Assassination of Jesse James by the Coward Robert Ford	San Francisco Bay Area Film Critics Circle	Best Supporting Actor	Won	
2007	The Assassination of Jesse James by the Coward Robert Ford	Southeastern Film Critics Association	Best Supporting Actor	Runner-up	
2007	The Assassination of Jesse James by the Coward Robert Ford	St. Louis Film Critics Association	Best Supporting Actor	Won	
2007	The Assassination of Jesse James by the Coward Robert Ford	Toronto Film Critics Association	Best Supporting Actor	Runner-up	
2008	Gone Baby Gone	Houston Film Critics Society	Best Actor	Nominated	
2008	The Assassination of Jesse James by the Coward Robert Ford	Houston Film Critics Society	Best Supporting Actor	Nominated	
2008	The Assassination of Jesse James by the Coward Robert Ford	International Cinephile Society	Best Supporting Actor	Won	
2008	The Assassination of Jesse James by the Coward Robert Ford	London Film Critics' Circle	Actor of the Year	Nominated	
2008	The Assassination of Jesse James by the Coward Robert Ford	National Society of Film Critics	Best Supporting Actor	Won	
2008	The Assassination of Jesse James by the Coward Robert Ford	Online Film Critics Society	Best Supporting Actor	Nominated	
2008	The Assassination of Jesse James by the Coward Robert Ford	Vancouver Film Critics Circle	Best Supporting Actor	Nominated	
2010	The Killer Inside Me	Dublin Film Critics' Circle	Best Actor	Nominated	
2016	Manchester by the Sea	Alliance of Women Film Journalists	Best Actor	Won	
2016	Manchester by the Sea	Austin Film Critics Association	Best Actor	Won	
2016	Manchester by the Sea	Boston Society of Film Critics	Best Actor	Won	
2016	Manchester by the Sea	Boston Online Film Critics Association	Best Actor	Won	
2016	Manchester by the Sea	Chicago Film Critics Association	Best Actor	Won	
2016	Manchester by the Sea	Dallas–Fort Worth Film Critics Association	Best Actor	Won	
2016	Manchester by the Sea	Detroit Film Critics Society	Best Actor	Won	
2016	Manchester by the Sea	Florida Film Critics Circle	Best Actor	Won	
2016	Manchester by the Sea	IndieWire Critics Poll	Best Actor	Won	
2016	Manchester by the Sea	Kansas City Film Critics Circle	Best Actor	Won	
2016	Manchester by the Sea	Las Vegas Film Critics Society	Best Actor	Won	
2016	Manchester by the Sea	Los Angeles Film Critics Association	Best Actor	Runner-up	
2016	Manchester by the Sea	National Board of Review	Best Actor	Won	
2016	Manchester by the Sea	New York Film Critics Circle	Best Actor	Won	
2016	Manchester by the Sea	New York Film Critics Online	Best Actor	Won	
2016	Manchester by the Sea	Online Film Critics Society	Best Actor	Won	
2016	Manchester by the Sea	Phoenix Film Critics Society	Best Actor	Won	
2016	Manchester by the Sea	San Diego Film Critics Society	Best Actor	Won	
2016	Manchester by the Sea	San Francisco Bay Area Film Critics Circle	Best Actor	Nominated	
2016	Manchester by the Sea	Southeastern Film Critics Association	Best Actor	Won	
2016	Manchester by the Sea	St. Louis Film Critics Association	Best Actor	Won	
2016	Manchester by the Sea	Toronto Film Critics Association	Best Actor	Runner-up	
2016	Manchester by the Sea	Vancouver Film Critics Circle	Best Actor	Won	
2016	Manchester by the Sea	Village Voice Film Poll	Best Actor	Won	
2016	Manchester by the Sea	Washington D.C. Area Film Critics Association	Best Actor	Won	
2016	Manchester by the Sea	Women Film Critics Circle	Best Actor	Won	
2017	Manchester by the Sea	Georgia Film Critics Association	Best Actor	Won	
2017	Manchester by the Sea	Houston Film Critics Society	Best Actor	Won	
2017	Manchester by the Sea	International Cinephile Society	Best Actor	Runner-up	
2017	Manchester by the Sea	London Film Critics' Circle	Actor of the Year	Won	
2017	Manchester by the Sea	National Society of Film Critics	Best Actor	Won	
2017	Manchester by the Sea	Seattle Film Critics Society	Best Actor	Won	

== Film festivals ==
Year	Association	Award	Nominated work	Result	Ref.
2008	Santa Barbara International Film Festival	Virtuoso Award	The Assassination of Jesse James by the Coward Robert Ford and Gone Baby Gone	Won	
2010	Copenhagen International Documentary Film Festival	CPH:DOX Award	I'm Still Here	Nominated	
2010	Gijón International Film Festival	Best Film	I'm Still Here	Nominated	
2010	Venice Film Festival	Biografia Lancia Award	I'm Still Here	Won	
2013	Seattle International Film Festival	Golden Space Needle Award for Best Actor	Ain't Them Bodies Saints	Nominated	
2016	Gijón International Film Festival	AISGE Award for Best Actor	Manchester by the Sea	Won	
2016	Telluride Film Festival	Silver Medallion	Himself	Won	
2017	Karlovy Vary International Film Festival	President's Award	Himself	Won	
2017	Palm Springs International Film Festival	Desert Palm Achievement Award	Manchester by the Sea	Won	
2017	Santa Barbara International Film Festival	Cinema Vanguard Award (Note: Shared with Michelle Williams)	Manchester by the Sea	Won	
2019	Jerusalem Film Festival	Best International Film	Light of My Life	Nominated	
2019	La Roche-sur-Yon International Film Festival	Grand Jury Prize – International Competition	Light of My Life	Nominated	
2022	Riviera International Film Festival	Icon Award	Himself	Won	
2026	Deauville American Film Festival	Grand Special Prize	Company	Nominated	
2026	Venice Film Festival	Golden Lion	Company	Nominated	
