= Lachlan Milne (cinematographer) =

Australian cinematographer

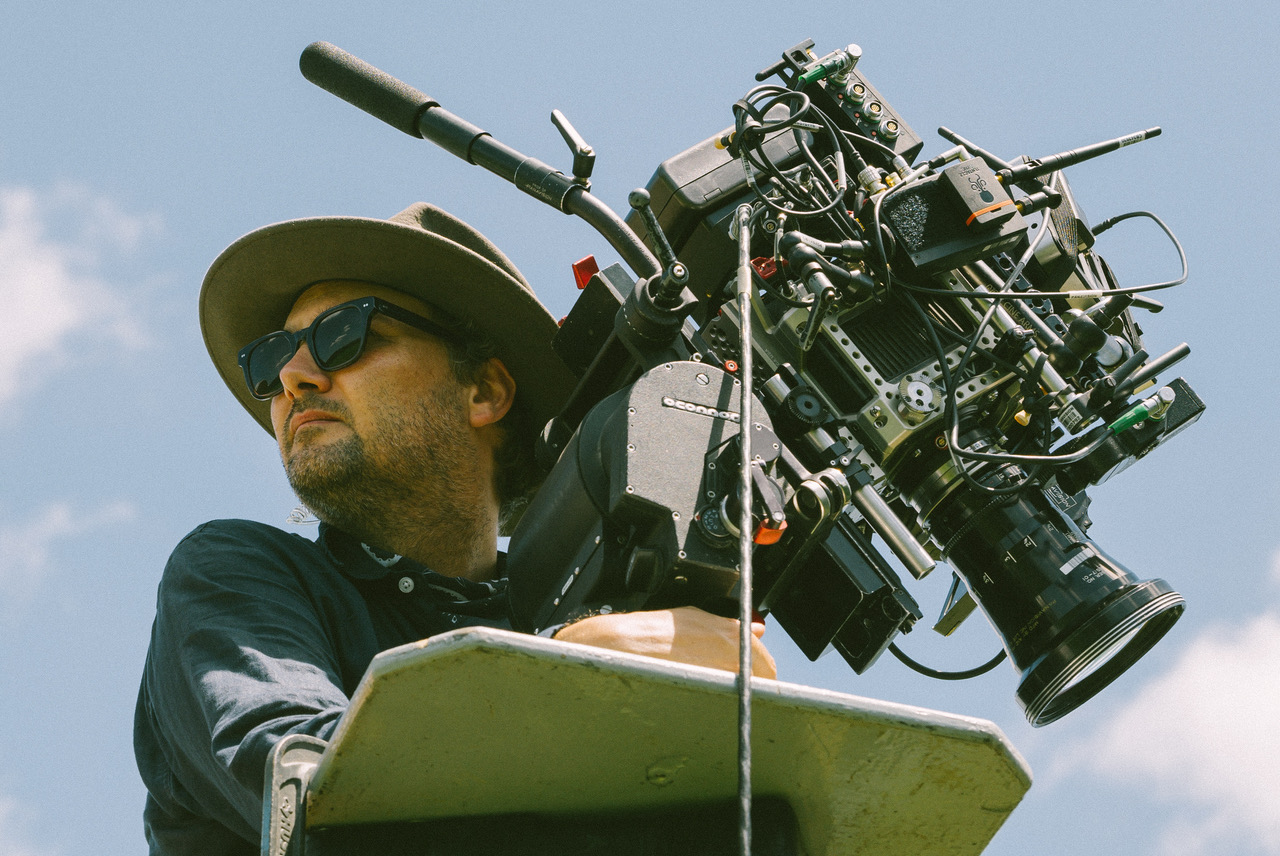
- Born: Australia
- Years active: 2000–present

Lachlan Milne, ACS, NZCS, is an Australian cinematographer.

== Filmography ==
=== Feature film ===
Year	Title	Director	Notes
2010	Uninhabited	Bill Bennett	
2012	Not Suitable for Children	Peter Templeman	
2016	Hunt for the Wilderpeople	Taika Waititi	
2016	Down Under	Abe Forsythe	
2019	Little Monsters	Abe Forsythe	
2020	Minari	Lee Isaac Chung	
2020	Love and Monsters	Michael Matthews	
2022	The Inspection	Elegance Bratton	With Mark Jeevaratnam
2023	Next Goal Wins	Taika Waititi	
2024	Exhibiting Forgiveness	Titus Kaphar	
2025	Golden	Michel Gondry	Unreleased
2026	Company	Casey Affleck	

=== Television ===
Year	Title	Director	Notes
2006	The Away Game	Scott Ferguson	Documentary film
2009	Scariacs	Simon Adams; Shane Elsmore	
2019	Stranger Things	Shawn Levy; The Duffer Brothers	4 episodes
2024	Lady in the Lake	Alma Har'el	Miniseries

== Awards and nominations ==
Year	Award	Category	Title	Result	Ref.
2017	New Zealand film and television awards	Best Cinematography	Hunt for the Wilderpeople	Nominated	
2021	Critics' Choice Movie Awards	Best Cinematography	Minari	Nominated	
2021	Gold Derby Awards	Best Cinematography	Minari	Nominated	
2021	Austin Film Critics Association	Best Cinematography	Minari	Nominated	
