= Angels Fallen =

2020 film by Ali Zamani

- Poster
- Directed by: Ali Zamani
- Written by: Amanda Barton
- Produced by: Rhett Giles; Jonathan Haug; Justin Jones; Zeus Zamani
- Starring: Nicola Posener; Houston Rhines; Michael Teh; Li Jing; Michael Madsen; Said Legue; Caroline Amiguet; Eric Roberts
- Cinematography: Dane Lawing
- Edited by: Megan Butterworth
- Music by: Scott Anthony Gould
- Production company: AZ Film Studios
- Distributed by: Uncork'd Entertainment
- Release date: January 14, 2020
- Running time: 86 minutes
- Country: United States
- Language: English

Angels Fallen is a 2020 science fiction action adventure horror film directed by Ali Zamani, written by Amanda Barton, and starring Nicola Posener, Houston Rhines, Michael Teh, Li Jing, Eric Roberts and Michael Madsen.

== Plot ==
After the tragic loss of his wife battling the forces of darkness, Gabriel is persuaded to rejoin his former team of demon hunters traveling from relative obscurity in America to the deep unknown regions of Europe. He is joined by his estranged best friend Michael who harbors a dark secret, the mystical Hannah whose visions predict the future, and a motley crew of demon slayers. After losing part of his team, Gabriel must confront his tragic past and decide who really is friend or foe.

== Cast ==
- Nicola Posener as Hannah
- Houston Rhines as Gabriel
- Michael Teh as Michael
- Li Jing as Lola
- Michael Madsen as Balthazar
- Said Legue as Ty
- Caroline Amiguet as Valentina
- Eric Roberts as Werrick
- Lee Kholafai as Jax Fury

== Production ==
It was announced that Ali Zamani would direct Amanda Barton's script. Michael Madsen was cast along with Nicola Posener, Houston Rhines and Michael Teh.

== Release ==
The film was released on DVD and digital January 14, 2020, by Uncork'd Entertainment. The film is currently available for free on Freevee, Tubi, Redbox, and Amazon Prime Video.

== Critical response ==
Brandon Henry at Horror Buzz said the movie starts off interesting, but was left confused at the end. Nathan Wyckoff at Horror News said the cast gave a "solid effort" but it was not enough to be considered a successful film. Both Jim Morazzini at Voices from the Balcony and Alain Elliott at Nerdly scored it a 1 out of 5.

== Sequel ==
A sequel called Angels Fallen: Warriors of Peace was announced to star Denise Richards.
