= John Middleton (businessman) =

American heir and billionaire

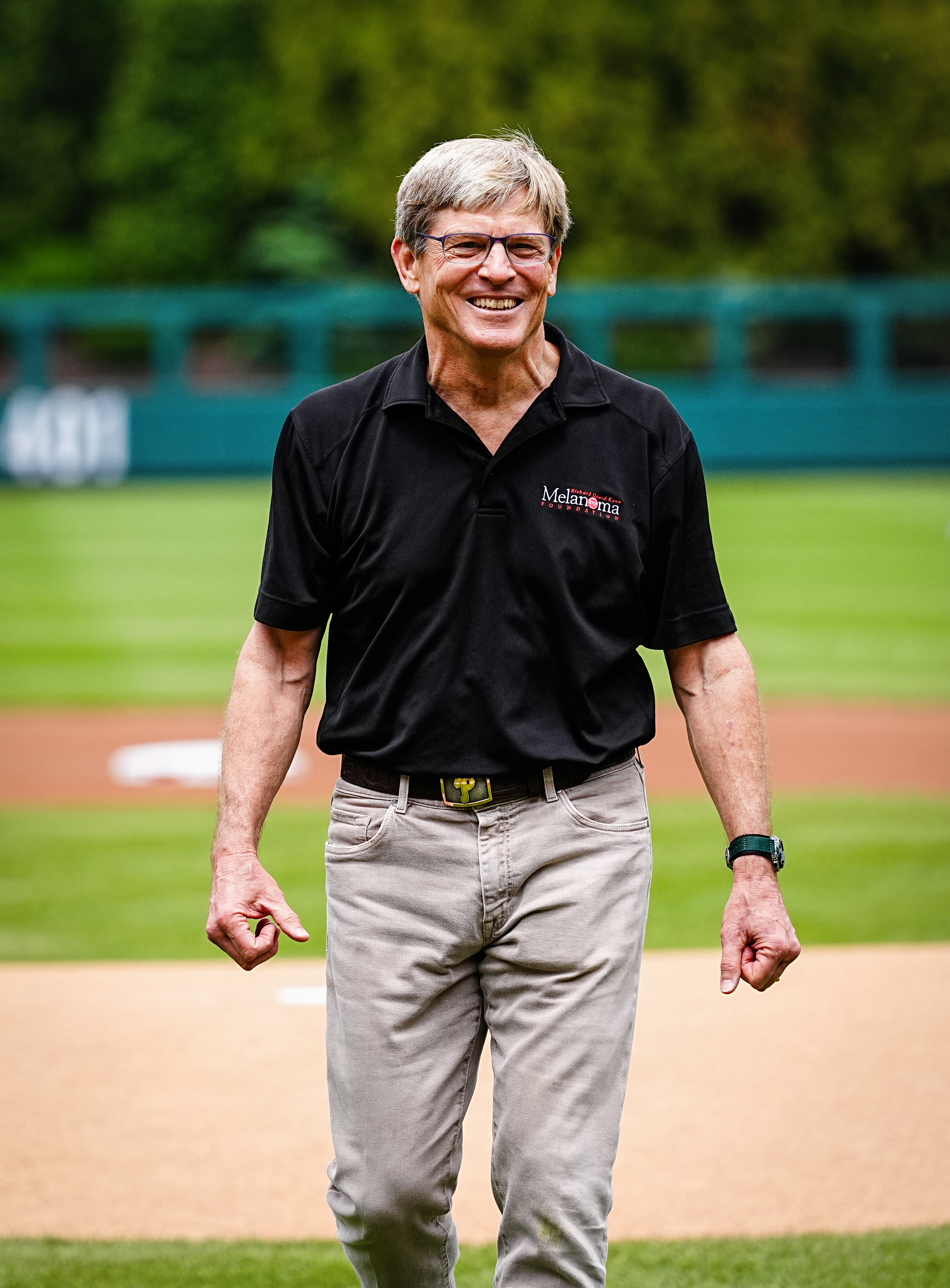
- Middleton in 2023
- Born: John Staubus Middleton; March 2, 1955 (age 71)
- Education: Amherst College (B.A.); Harvard Business School (MBA)
- Occupation: Businessman
- Spouse: Leigh Middleton
- Children: 2, including John

John Staubus Middleton (born March 2, 1955) is an American businessman and philanthropist. He is the managing partner and principal owner of the Philadelphia Phillies of Major League Baseball. He purchased a minority stake in 1994 and increased his ownership to 48 percent by 2014. He became the Phillies' controlling owner in 2016. In 2026, he was elected to the American Philosophical Society.

== Early life, education and family ==
John Staubus Middleton, son of Herbert and Frances (née Staubus) Middleton, was born on March 2, 1955. The Middleton family descends from John Middleton, who, in 1857, founded John Middleton Co., a Philadelphia retail tobacco shop that evolved into a manufacturer and marketer of pipe tobacco and cigars.

He graduated from the Haverford School in 1973. He was a wrestler at Amherst College from where he graduated magna cum laude in 1977 with his bachelor's degree in economics. He then attended Harvard Business School, graduating in 1979 with his Master of Business Administration.

Middleton is married to Leigh Middleton, and they have two children, Frances "Francie" Fields, and film and television producer John Powers Middleton. As of 2016, Middleton and his wife are residents of Bryn Mawr, Pennsylvania.

== Career ==
Middleton began working at his family's cigar business at age 16. After graduating from Harvard Business School, he returned home to work at John Middleton Inc. where his father put him on the company's board. Under Middleton, the company bought four tobacco brands from R.J. Reynolds in 1987, transforming the company into a major corporate interest in the pipe tobacco industry, and facilitating the subsequent growth of its packaged-cigar business.

In 2003, Middleton bought all shares in the family company from his mother and sisters. In 2007, Middleton sold John Middleton Co. to Altria, the parent of Phillip Morris USA, for $2.9 billion. In 2015 litigation was filed by Middleton’s sister, disputing declared company assets from 2003, which was settled out of court for $22 million in 2018.

Middleton is the president of Bradford Holdings, the parent company whose subsidiaries have included John Middleton Inc., Double Play Inc. (the corporate entity that holds his stake in the Phillies) and McIntosh Inns.

Middleton's net worth was approximately $4.3 billion as of August 2026, making him one of the world's 1,000 wealthiest people, according to Forbes estimates.

=== Philadelphia Phillies ===
Middleton bought a 15 percent stake in the Phillies for $18 million in 1994. He has been elected chairman of its partners’ Advisory Board annually since 1998.

When Phillies' chairman David Montgomery took a medical leave of absence in 2014, Middleton assumed a more active role, overseeing on-field and business performance, and increased his shareholding to 48 percent. In 2015, Middleton became the public face of the Phillies' ownership group. Middleton committed that the Phillies would have a greater focus on analytics.

At the November 2016 MLB owners’ meeting, Middleton was elected the Phillies’ control person by the thirty clubs, making him the primary person accountable to the commissioner's office for the Phillies' operations and compliance with MLB rules.

Since the Phillies had not made the playoffs since 2011, Middleton recognized it was time for a change. In December 2020, Middleton contacted Dave Dombrowski, a two-time World Series champion executive. Together, they created a deal, and Middleton hired him as the Phillies’ president of baseball operations.

In February 2021, he became one of eight members of Major League Baseball’s Executive Council, and served a four-year term, leaving the role in February 2025.

In November 2024, Middleton announced that three new investors would be added to the team’s ownership group and his family would be contributing additional funds. Also in 2024, Middleton took on a leadership role, in partnership with Comcast Spectacor, to execute a development initiative for the South Philadelphia sports complex.

==== Support of Dick Allen ====
For several years, Middleton pushed for the recognition of famed Phillies player Dick Allen, whom he had admired since childhood, in the Baseball Hall of Fame. In 2020, Middleton guided the Hall of Fame to break tradition and retire Allen’s number while the player was still alive. Before Allen’s 2025 posthumous Baseball Hall of Fame induction, Middleton spoke of Allen’s strong ethics following racism and criticism during his career.

== Philanthropy ==
Middleton and his wife, Leigh, share philanthropic involvement in several organizations, including the Philadelphia Museum of Art, Penn Medicine, the Bryn Mawr Presbyterian Church, the Academy of Natural Sciences, and Project HOME.

In 2012, the Middletons announced a gift of more than $16.2 million to the Philadelphia School District, Philadelphia Youth Network, Philadelphia Academies and Drexel University for career and technical education.

In 2013, the Middletons pledged $30 million to Project HOME in an effort to end chronic homelessness by doubling the number of its apartments for homeless people, opening a new medical center and leveraging additional public and private funds.

The Middletons received the 2013 Philadelphia Award, in 2014, for their philanthropic works in the Philadelphia area, directed towards education, homelessness, and workforce development projects.

The couple has made four Matching Gift contributions to the Eagles Autism Challenge between 2019 and 2023.

Middleton served as a member of the board of trustees of Amherst College, which awarded him its Medal for Eminent Service in 2004, in recognition of his dedication to the college.
