= C.I.Ape =

2021 American action comedy film

- Promotional release poster
- Directed by: Ali Zamani
- Written by: Stephen Johnston; Jerome Reygner-Kalfon
- Produced by: Zeus Zamani
- Starring: Sophia Alongi; Skip Schwink; Madelyn Kientz; Lucas Ross
- Production company: ACE Entertainment Films
- Distributed by: Lionsgate
- Release date: September 28, 2021
- Running time: 82 minutes
- Country: United States
- Language: English
- Box office: $90,285

C.I.Ape (stylized in all caps) is a 2021 American spy action comedy film directed by Ali Zamani. The film's plot centers around a chimpanzee who becomes a member of the Central Intelligence Agency (CIA).

== Production ==
Principal photography took place in central Oklahoma in June and July 2020. Filming took place in the cities of Weatherford and Guthrie.

== Reception ==
Jennifer Borget of Common Sense Media gave the film a score of two out of five stars, calling it "a simple action comedy that's as silly as it sounds."
