= Incision (film) =

2020 American horror film

- Theatrical release poster
- Directed by: Ali Zamani
- Written by: Chris Kato
- Produced by: Lee Kholafai; Korrina Rico; Zeus Zamani
- Starring: Costas Mandylor; Caylee Cowan; Kev Adams; Jonathan McDaniel; Olga Safari; Jason Genao
- Cinematography: Vern Nobles
- Edited by: Gregory McKarus
- Release date: October 27, 2020
- Running time: 79 minutes
- Country: United States
- Language: English

Incision is a 2020 American horror film thriller directed by Ali Zamani written by Chris Kato produced by Korrina Rico and Lee Kholafai starring Costas Mandylor, Caylee Cowan, Kev Adams, Jonathan McDaniel, Olga Safari, and Jason Genao.

== Cast ==
- Costas Mandylor as Doctor Bennett
- Caylee Cowan as Becca Landry
- Lee Kholafai as Matt Casey
- Korrina Rico as Alexa Landry
- Kev Adams as Chase
- Jonathan McDaniel as Calvin $oundz
- Olga Safari as Trinity Lee
- Tristan Tales as Kenny Newman

== Production ==
In October 2020, it was announced Costas Mandylor of the saw (franchise), and producers Korrina Rico and Lee Kholafai were to release the feature film on video on demand streaming on October 27, 2020. Principal photography took place in and around Los Angeles, California.

== Reviews ==
The movie was reviewed in detail by Rue morgue's Dakota Dahl who states that "the whole film is chock full of overtly beautiful people which must be a directorial choice, because these people are some of the least in need of plastic surgery you’ll ever see." and stating that the actors are "stiff" and "wooden," but that this isn't a criticism, since "the cast being full of bad actors helps to draw attention to the fact that they are so used to cruising by on their looks alone." The only actors to receive complimentary remarks were James Allen Brewer who "steals the show," and Caylee Cowan who plays the leads sister in an "incredibly dark B-plot that is promptly dropped, allowing Becca to be awesomely spacey and aloof for the rest of the film. She’s the only person we are rooting for." The review critic states that the film is "a recipe for a perfect blend of high-brow and low-brow."

The movie was also reviewed by Enrique Acosta at Film Threat who says "Incision has its share of problems, it is a strong freshman effort from the new filmmakers" and that the film is "a very raw and amateurish production, with pacing issues." However, the reviewer was inclined to continue watching till the end because it "…creates a sense of menace that pervades most of the movie."
