= Joe Manganiello =

American actor (born 1976)

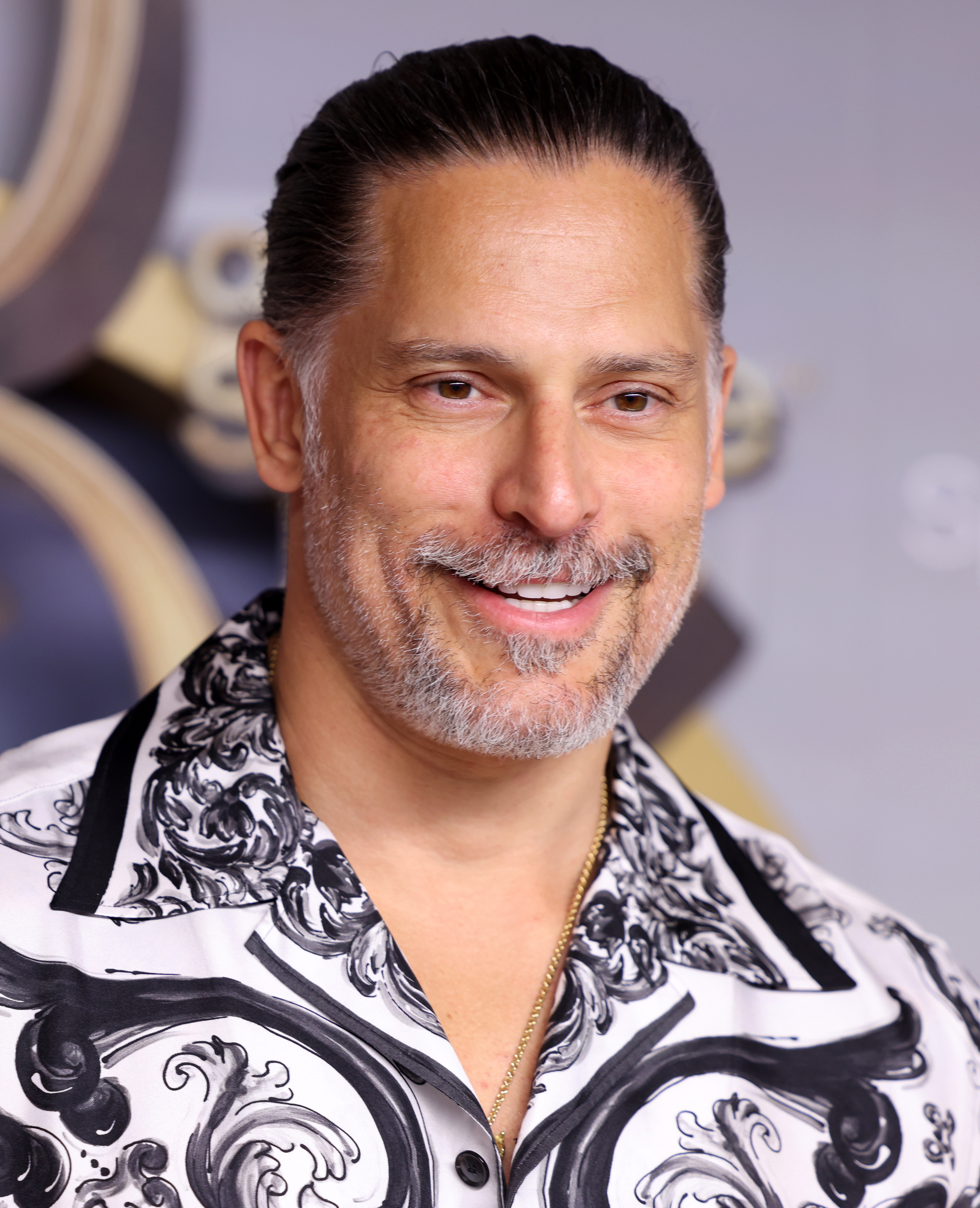
- Manganiello in 2025
- Born: Joseph Michael Manganiello; December 28, 1976 (age 49); Pittsburgh, Pennsylvania, U.S.
- Citizenship: U.S.; Italy
- Education: Carnegie Mellon University (BFA)
- Occupation: Actor
- Years active: 1995–present
- Spouse: Sofía Vergara (m. 2015; div. 2024)
- Partner: Caitlin O'Connor

Joseph Michael Manganiello (/ˌmæŋɡəˈnɛloʊ/ MANG-gə-NEL-oh; born December 28, 1976) is an American actor, author, and producer. His professional film career began when he played Flash Thompson in Sam Raimi's Spider-Man. His breakout role was as werewolf Alcide Herveaux in five seasons of the HBO series True Blood.

He is also known for his roles in films such as Magic Mike, Magic Mike XXL, Pee-wee's Big Holiday, What to Expect When You're Expecting, Sabotage, and Rampage. In late 2013, he became a published author when his first book, Evolution, was released by Simon & Schuster's Gallery Books. He also pubished his second book in 2026, Bloodlines, released by Simon & Schuster's and became a National Bestseler in its first week. His directorial debut came in 2014 with the documentary feature La Bare, which he also produced and financed. He is also known for his role as Brad Morris in How I Met Your Mother. He is active with several charities, primarily UPMC Children's Hospital of Pittsburgh for which he serves on the board of trustees. In 2016, he was cast as Slade Wilson / Deathstroke in the DC Extended Universe, making his first appearance in 2017's Justice League.

== Early life ==
Manganiello was born in Pittsburgh, Pennsylvania, to Susan and Charles Manganiello. He has a younger brother, Nicholas. His mother is of Armenian, Croatian, and German descent. Manganiello's father was born in Massachusetts outside of Boston. Joe Manganiello was raised in Mt. Lebanon, Pennsylvania, an affluent suburb of Pittsburgh bordering the city. Raised Catholic, he was a student at St. Bernard School, a Catholic elementary school in Mt. Lebanon, Pennsylvania and then attended Mt. Lebanon High School, where he graduated with honors in 1995 and won the school's Great Alumni Award in 2011.

Growing up, he was the captain of his football, basketball, and volleyball teams and went on to play at the varsity level in all three sports. He won the role of Jud Fry in his school's senior year production of Oklahoma! and was involved with the school's TV studio. He would borrow equipment in order to write and direct films with his friends, which eventually inspired him to begin studying acting.

Manganiello suffered a series of sports injuries through high school, including a torn medial collateral ligament while returning a kickoff in a varsity football game against Ringgold High School. The time off allowed Manganiello to reevaluate his future and so he decided to audition for the Carnegie Mellon School of Drama during his senior year. He was not accepted, so he enrolled at the University of Pittsburgh and worked over the next year in the theater. He then reapplied to Carnegie Mellon a year later, and was awarded a scholarship, accepted into the acting program that year. There he performed in theater productions and wrote, produced, and acted in a student film entitled Out of Courage 2: Out for Vengeance. He graduated in 2000 with a Bachelor of Fine Arts degree in acting. He then traveled to New York City and Los Angeles through his university to participate in group auditions, which provided him contacts in the entertainment business including an agent, a manager, and a screen test for Sam Raimi's Spider-Man.

In the February 7, 2023, episode of PBS series Finding Your Roots, the researchers uncovered that Manganiello's legal paternal grandfather, Emilio Manganiello, was not his biological grandfather, and that his biological great-grandparents were an African-American man named William Henry Cutler and a white woman named Nellie Alton. His biological paternal grandfather was one of Cutler and Alton's three mixed-race African-American sons. Using this information, researchers traced Manganiello's paternal lineage back to his great-great-great-great-great-grandfather, Plato Turner, an African slave who was freed before slavery was abolished in Massachusetts and who went on to fight for the Continental Army during the American Revolution. Manganiello's maternal great-grandmother, Terviz "Rose" Darakjian, was a survivor of the Armenian genocide, where her husband and seven of her children were killed. Darakjian's eighth child, an infant, drowned during Darakjian's escape across the Euphrates River. Darakjian later encountered Karl Wilhelm Beutinger, a German soldier, in an internment camp for survivors. Rose became pregnant by him. Beutinger soon left to return to Germany. He resumed his life there with his German wife and children, and never saw Rose Darakjian again. Manganiello's grandmother is the child of Beutinger and Rose Darakjian.

== Career ==
=== Early career ===
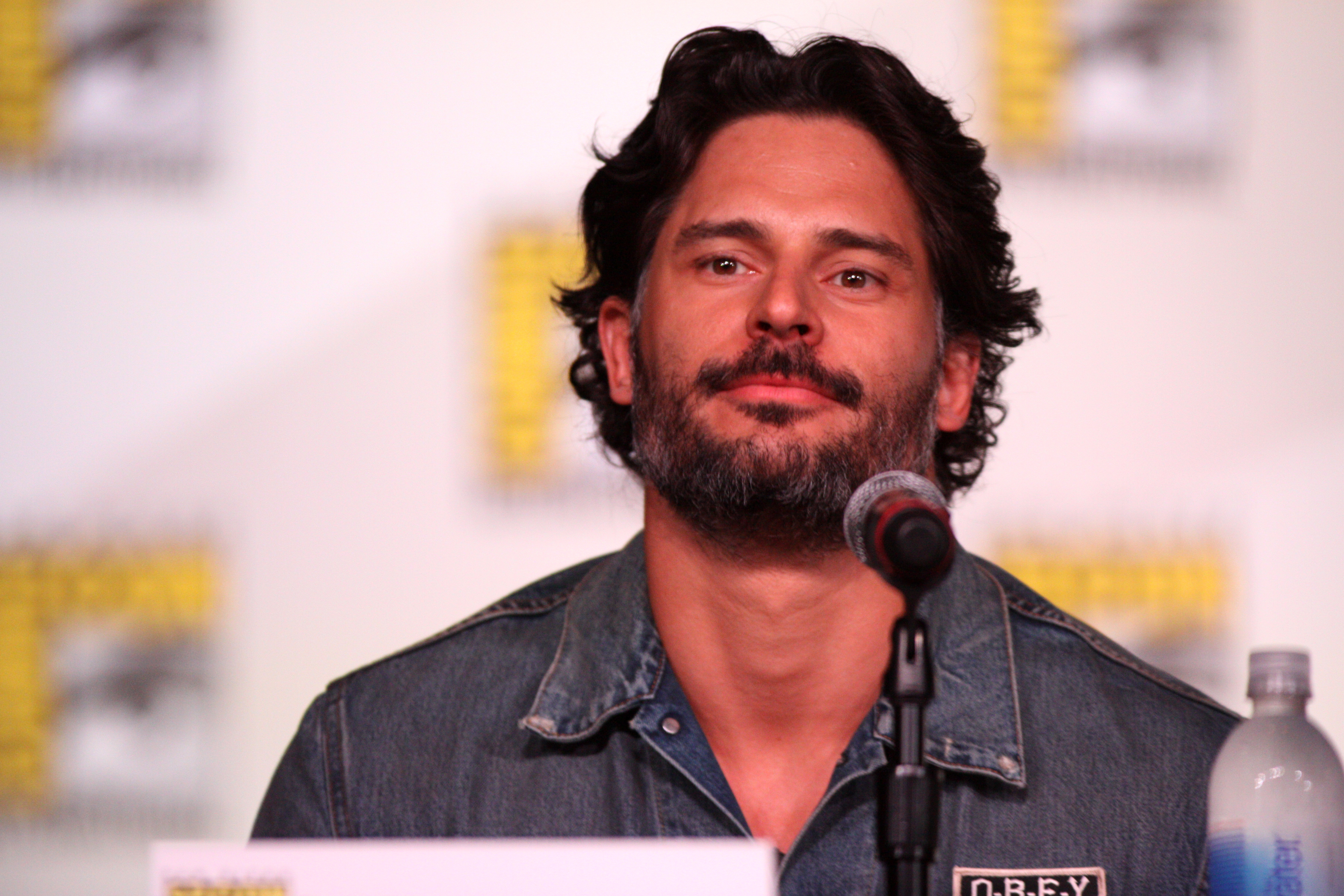
Manganiello at the 2012 San Diego Comic-Con

While a student at Carnegie Mellon University, Manganiello appeared in numerous productions in Pittsburgh's theatre scene, including Ulfheim in Henrik Ibsen's When We Dead Awaken, Lorenzo in Shakespeare's The Merchant of Venice for Quantum Theatre, and Joe in the Pittsburgh premiere of The Last Night of Ballyhoo. He moved to Los Angeles, California, after graduating from Carnegie Mellon. He quickly signed with a talent agent, and three days later, he auditioned for the role of Peter Parker in the Sam Raimi-directed film Spider-Man (2002). He landed the role of Eugene "Flash" Thompson, Peter Parker's nemesis in high school, as his first acting job out of college. He reprised the role several years later, making a brief cameo in Spider-Man 3 (2007).

Manganiello began finding work in television, playing Tori Spelling's boyfriend on VH1's So Notorious in 2006, and guest starred on Las Vegas, Jake in Progress, and Close to Home. That year, he also played John Leguizamo's Alcoholics Anonymous sponsor in the CBS television pilot Edison. In 2007, he appeared in the Scrubs episode "My No Good Reason" and in the MyNetwork TV nighttime soap opera American Heiress. He also played Officer Litchman, the love interest to Linda Cardellini's character, for a four-episode arc on NBC's ER. He returned to the stage playing The Chick Magnet in May 2007 for the New York City premiere of Skirts & Flirts, a monologue show by Gloria Calderon Kellett, for which he was a finalist for HBO's Aspen Comedy Festival. He then played Stanley Kowalski in A Streetcar Named Desire for the West Virginia Public Theatre in 2008, directed by his former Carnegie Mellon professor Geoffrey Hitch.

He starred as Leo Belraggio, a New York jazz musician, in the West Coast premiere of Terrence McNally's Unusual Acts of Devotion in June 2009. The play was staged at the La Jolla Playhouse at the University of California, San Diego. The summer prior, Manganiello worked alongside McNally and director Leonard Foglia to create the role at the Ojai Playwrights Conference. He played the lawyer Brad Morris on several seasons of the CBS comedy How I Met Your Mother. In 2008, he joined the cast of The CW drama One Tree Hill for its fifth season, playing bartender Owen Morello. He shot the series in Wilmington, North Carolina, and returned for its sixth and seventh seasons.

Manganiello played Stu on the Fox sitcom 'Til Death for two episodes, and starred in the short film Wounded that year, which he originated on the stage and won Best Short Film at the 2011 Big Island Film Festival. He starred in the direct-to-video war film Behind Enemy Lines: Colombia in 2009 playing Lt. Sean Macklin, a Navy SEAL squad leader. In order to add authenticity to the production, he trained for several months with a former Navy SEAL, for whom he paid to come to the set and stay in the cast's hotel. The film was shot in Puerto Rico. He appeared in an episode of Medium in 2009, and has guest starred on all three series of CBS's CSI television franchise (CSI: Crime Scene Investigation, CSI: Miami, and CSI: NY). He had a role in the independent film Irene in Time. In 2010, he appeared in television commercials for Taco Bell, promoting its new product. He shot television pilots for 100 Questions and the Pittsburgh-set sitcom Livin' on a Prayer.

=== True Blood ===
In late 2009, Manganiello was cast as werewolf Alcide Herveaux in the third season of HBO's True Blood. His work on the show over the next five years would bring him both popular and critical recognition, including being voted The Favorite Pop-Culture Werewolf of All-Time by the readers of Entertainment Weekly Magazine, the 2011 Scream Award for Breakout Performance – Male, as well as a shared award for Best Ensemble, a Saturn Award for Best Guest Starring Role in Television and a NewNowNext Award. True Blood was his favorite television show before he joined the cast. He was originally brought in by casting for the role of Coot, another werewolf in the series, but was asked by the producers to read for Alcide instead. He familiarized himself with the novels while growing out his hair and beard. He also trained twice a day for months to add muscle to match the description of the character in the books. Manganiello also got a suntan to set himself apart from the vampires on the series and spent time studying live wolves.

In early 2011, Manganiello was asked to screen test for the title role of Superman in Man of Steel, for which he was rumored to be the front runner, but due to scheduling problems with True Blood, he was forced to drop out during the final stage. He told Access Hollywood in an interview: "They wanted me to screen test and they actually asked for my measurements for the suit and everything... their shoot date switched and it would have taken up 11 weeks out of my True Blood schedule. At the end of the day, we couldn't get the schedule to work... so, regrettably, I never got to screen test, I never got to put the suit on."

Upon completion of filming for season four of True Blood, he shot an episode of USA's White Collar with his former drama school classmate Matt Bomer, and then shot the film adaptation of the best-selling book What to Expect When You're Expecting before returning to Los Angeles to shoot an episode of Two and a Half Men with Ashton Kutcher.

=== Magic Mike and other projects ===
Manganiello was cast as Big Dick Richie in Steven Soderbergh's Magic Mike, the story of a male stripper in Tampa, Florida, played by actor Channing Tatum. Magic Mike would go on to become a cultural and box office phenomenon spawning its 2015 sequel Magic Mike XXL.

In between Magic Mike films and finishing out his last two seasons of True Blood, Manganiello branched out in a multitude of different ways. He shot David Ayer's Sabotage with his childhood idol Arnold Schwarzenegger, who would go on to become a friend and mentor to Manganiello, penning the foreword to his book Evolution which was released through Simon & Schuster's Gallery Books in the fall of 2013. That autumn also saw Manganiello's return to the stage once again as Stanley Kowalski in A Streetcar Named Desire but this time for the prestigious Yale Repertory Theater in New Haven, Connecticut.

A few months later, Manganiello would take his documentary film La Bare, which he financed, directed, and produced under his new production company banner 3:59 with his brother Nick, to Park City, Utah, for the Slamdance Film Festival. He received multiple offers from distributors in the lobby after the first screening and within 24 hours sold the International and Domestic rights, including sales to Showtime and Netflix. Manganiello was given the Triple Threat Award from the Maui International Film Festival later that year for his work on the film.

=== After True Blood ===
In August 2016, test footage of Slade Wilson/Deathstroke was posted to Twitter by writer/director Ben Affleck. A few weeks later, Geoff Johns, DC Comics' then President and CCO, who was tasked to co-write/co-produce the solo Batman film with Affleck, confirmed that Deathstroke would appear in the shared film universe, with Manganiello portraying the character. In 2019, he was confirmed to appear in the Ben Affleck Batman film. However, Affleck was asked to step down from the film and Manganiello's future as the character has remained uncertain ever since.

In 2017, Manganiello won an Emmy as the narrator of the documentary Pittsburgh is Home: The Story of the Penguins, which documented the first 50 years of history of the Pittsburgh Penguins hockey team.

=== Dungeons & Dragons / Fantasy ===
Over the years, Manganiello has worked extensively with Dungeons & Dragons as a writer, official ambassador, and paid consultant. His characters, including Arkhan the Cruel, are a part of Dungeons & Dragons canon, appearing in adventure modules, video games, and in toy stores. He has appeared in episodes of The Big Bang Theory, Nerd Poker, CelebriD&D, Critical Role and the web series Force Grey playing the game. In 2017, Manganiello and John Cassel wrote a spec-script for a film adaptation of the first Dragonlance novel for Warner Brothers. In 2018, he launched the company Death Saves which produces fantasy/heavy-metal themed streetwear as well as a range of high end jewelry, clothing and gaming accessories. Over the years, the company has created officially licensed products for the television series Game of Thrones and The Dark Crystal: Age of Resistance, the indie horror film Mandy, Dungeons & Dragons, and at one point had full reign over the catalog of the late fantasy painter, Frank Frazetta.

He worked as a game designer for Hasbro's remake of the adventure board game HeroQuest to write a quest book as a stretch goal in 2020. Although the stretch goal was not reached, he later announced he worked with Hasbro to have the quest book and additional game pieces included anyway.

In October 2022, Hasbro's eOne announced that Manganiello had been tapped to direct and produce the first, official documentary about the history of Dungeons & Dragons, along with co-director Kyle Newman and his brother and producing partner Nick under their 3:59 banner, to be timed to release during the 50th anniversary of the game in 2024.

== Personal life ==
Manganiello is a lifelong fan of the Pittsburgh Steelers. He directed and produced the 2007 short documentary DieHardz about Steelers fans who meet up at bars in Los Angeles, California. He is also a Pittsburgh Penguins fan and hosted the 2017 NHL Awards and the 2017 NHL expansion draft.

Manganiello is a long time fan of Dungeons & Dragons.

He was once a roadie for the band Goldfinger and is friends with lead singer John Feldmann; he toured internationally with the group as a member of their security.

He became engaged to actress Sofía Vergara on Christmas Eve 2014 after six months of dating. They married in Palm Beach, Florida, on November 22, 2015. Manganiello filed for divorce on July 2 2023, citing "irreconcilable differences". On July 17, 2023, Manganiello and Vergara announced to Page Six that Manganiello had filed for divorce after seven years of marriage. The divorce was finalized in February 2024.

Since September 2023, he has been in a relationship with Caitlin O'Connor. In December 2025, the couple moved from Los Angeles, California to Pittsburgh, Pennsylvania where they both grew up.

He is a longtime practitioner of Transcendental Meditation and learned at the David Lynch Foundation center in Los Angeles.

In October 2022, he was granted Italian citizenship through his paternal grandmother's Sicilian ancestry.

He is an advocate for Armenian causes, and serves on the board of directors for Children of Armenia Fund. In 2025, he joined the Armenian Assembly of America's Advocacy Summit in Washington, D.C., and was a keynote speaker at the United States Congress' Armenian Genocide commemoration.

His second book, a memoir titled Bloodlines, released on October 13th through Simon & Schuster's, Avid Reader Press. It documented his 7 year battle with a host of mysterious auto-immune conditions linked to his great-grandmother's survival of the Armenian Genocide.

== Filmography ==
=== Film ===
Year	Title	Role	Notes
2002	Out of Courage 2: Out for Vengeance	Ruslan Zmeyev / Writer / Producer	Short film
2002	Spider-Man	Flash Thompson	
2007	Spider-Man 3	Flash Thompson	Cameo
2008	Impact Point	Matt Cooper	
2008	Wounded	Patient	Short film
2009	Not Evelyn Cho	Ryan	Short film
2009	Behind Enemy Lines: Colombia	Lieutenant Sean Macklin	
2009	Irene in Time	Charlie	
2011	The Girl With the Tramp Stamp Tattoo	Mikael Blomkvist	Short film
2012	What to Expect When You're Expecting	Davis	
2012	Magic Mike	Big Dick Richie	
2014	Sabotage	DEA Agent Joe "Grinder" Phillips	
2015	Knight of Cups	Joe	
2015	Tumbledown	Curtis	
2015	Magic Mike XXL	Big Dick Richie	
2016	Pee-wee's Big Holiday	Himself	
2017	Smurfs: The Lost Village	Hefty Smurf (voice)	
2017	Justice League	Slade Wilson / Deathstroke	Uncredited cameo
2018	Rampage	Burke	
2019	Drunk Parents	Bob Donnelly	
2019	Bottom of the 9th	Sonny Stano	Also producer
2019	Jay and Silent Bob Reboot	Bailiff	
2020	The Sleepover	Leo	
2020	Archenemy	Max Fist	
2021	Shoplifters of the World	Mickey "Full Metal Mickey"	Also producer
2021	Zack Snyder's Justice League	Slade Wilson / Deathstroke	Uncredited cameo
2021	The Spine of Night	Mongrel	
2021	Koati	Balam (voice)	
2022	Metal Lords	Dr. Troy Nix	
2023	Magic Mike's Last Dance	Big Dick Richie	Cameo
2023	The Kill Room	Reggie	
2025	Nonnas	Bruno	

=== Television ===
Year	Title	Role	Notes
2006	Jake in Progress	Rick Cavanaugh	Episode: "Notting Hell"
2006	CSI: Crime Scene Investigation	Tom Harper	Episode: "Daddy's Little Girl"
2006	Las Vegas	Carson Stuart	Episode: "Urban Legend"
2006	Close to Home	James Miller	Episode: "Escape"
2006	So Notorious	Scott	Recurring role, 2 episodes
2006	A.K.A.	Brian	Television film
2006–2012	How I Met Your Mother	Brad Morris	Recurring role, 7 episodes
2007	Scrubs	Chad Miller	Episode: "My No Good Reason"
2007	American Heiress	Solomon Cortez	Main cast, 64 episodes
2007	ER	Officer Litchman	Recurring role, 4 episodes
2008	I Love the New Millennium	Himself	Episode: "2000"
2008–2010	'Til Death	Stu	Recurring role, 2 episodes
2008–2010	One Tree Hill	Owen Morello	Recurring role, 13 episodes
2009	CSI: Miami	Tony Ramirez	Episode: "Target Specific"
2009	Medium	Angelo Filipelli	Episode: "Once in a Lifetime"
2010	CSI: NY	Rob Meyers	Episode: "Criminal Justice"
2010	100 Questions	Rick	Episode: "What Brought You Here?"
2010	Livin' on a Prayer	Doug	Unaired pilot
2010–2014	True Blood	Alcide Herveaux	Main cast (42 episodes)
2010, 2014	WWE Raw	Himself	2 episodes
2011	Two and a Half Men	Alex	Episode: "The Squat and the Hover"
2012	White Collar	Ben Ryan	Episode: "Neighborhood Watch"
2013	Talking Dead	Himself	Episode #2.10
2014	Ink Master: Rivals	Himself	Guest Judge; Episode: "Pin-Up Pitfalls""
2015–2016	Blaze and the Monster Machines	Fire Chief (Voice)	2 episodes
2016	Mom	Julian	Episode: "Cinderella and a Drunk MacGyver"
2018	The Joel McHale Show with Joel McHale	Himself	Recurring role, 2 episodes
2018	No Activity	Dugan	2 episodes ("By the Siege Side" and "Operation Meat Puppet")
2019	One Day at a Time	Nick	Episode: "Drinking and Driving"
2019	The Big Bang Theory	Himself	Episode: "The D&D Vortex"
2019	Daybreak	Karl Pokaski	Episode: "5318008"
2019	Star Wars Resistance	Ax Tagrin (voice)	2 episodes
2021	A.P. Bio	Malachi	Episode: "Malachi"
2021–2025	Big City Greens	Viper Fang (voice)	4 episodes
2022	Bubble Guppies	Coldsnap (voice)	Episode: "Winter Sports Chompetition!"
2022	Love, Death & Robots	Coulthard (voice)	Episode: "In Vaulted Halls Entombed"
2022	Moonhaven	Tomm Schultz	6 episodes
2022	Mythic Quest	Himself	2 episodes
2024–2025	Deal or No Deal Island	Himself	Host
2026–present	One Piece	Mr. 0 / Sir Crocodile	Season 2 & Season 3
2026	Life, Larry and the Pursuit of Unhappiness	Johnny	Episode: "Lawrence"
TBA	Army of the Dead: Lost Vegas †	Rose (voice)	

=== Web shows and series ===
Year	Title	Role	Notes
2017	Force Grey: Lost City of Omu	Himself / Arkhan The Cruel	Main cast, 18 episodes
2017	Critical Role (campaign one)	Himself / Arkhan The Cruel	2 episodes ("The Final Ascent" and "Vecna, the Ascended")
2018	Spellslingers	Himself	1 episode
2018–2019	The Angel of Vine	Hank Briggs	Series regular, 10 episodes
2020	Good Mythical Morning	Himself	Episodes: "What Mask Am I Wearing? (GAME)"

=== Directing ===
Year	Title	Roles	Awards/Notes
2014	La Bare	Director, Producer, Financier	Winner - Triple Threat Award - Maui International Film Festival
TBA	Untitled Dungeons & Dragons documentary †	Director, Producer	In production

== Awards and nominations ==
Year	Group	Award	Work	Result
2011	NewNowNext Awards	'Cause You're Hot	True Blood	Won
2011	Saturn Award	Best Guest Starring Role in Television	True Blood	Won
2011	Scream Award	Breakout Performance – Male	True Blood	Won
2011	Scream Award	Best Ensemble	True Blood	Won
2012	Teen Choice Awards	Choice Movie Breakout: Male	What To Expect When You're Expecting	Nominated
2013	MTV Movie Awards	Best Musical Moment	Magic Mike	Nominated
2014	Maui Film Festival	Triple Threat Award (Directing, Producing, Acting)	La Bare	Won
2017	Mid-Atlantic Emmy Awards	Narrator - Sports Program One-Time Special	Pittsburgh is Home: The Story of the Penguins	Won
2025	San Diego International Film Festival	Spotlight Award	Lifetime Achievement	Honored
