= Company (2026 film) =

2026 film by Casey Affleck

- Directed by: Casey Affleck
- Written by: Casey Affleck; Ron Hansen
- Produced by: Steven Schneider; Roy Lee; Caylee Cowan; Dan Lawler; Casey Affleck; Sean O'Reilly; K. Asher Levin; Enzo Marc; Anthony Katagas
- Starring: Nick Nolte; Adelaide Clemens; Ben Mendelsohn; Scoot McNairy; Emily Alyn Lind; Caylee Cowan
- Cinematography: Masanobu Takayanagi; Lachlan Milne; Adam Arkapaw; Marcell Rév; Holger Jungnickel; Joaquin Baca Asay; Noah Fallis; Casey Affleck
- Edited by: Leslie Jones; Radek Sienski; Julie Monroe; Casey Affleck
- Music by: Daniel Hart
- Production companies: Image Nation Studios; Spooky Pictures; Rabbits Black; Artists Equity
- Release date: 8 September 2026 (Venice)
- Running time: 92 minutes
- Countries: Canada; United States; United Arab Emirates
- Language: English

Company is a 2026 anthology mystery film directed by Casey Affleck, which he co-wrote with Ron Hansen. A co-production of the United States and Canada, it stars Nick Nolte, Adelaide Clemens, Ben Mendelsohn, Scoot McNairy, Emily Alyn Lind and Caylee Cowan.

The film had its world premiere in the main competition of the 83rd Venice International Film Festival on 8 September 2026, where it competed for the Golden Lion.

== Premise ==
Set on a winter night in 1975, the film sees a mysterious woman named Evelyn arrive uninvited at a holiday gathering and tell the story of Tom, an aging hermit who rescues a stranded actress during a Colorado blizzard more than 20 years earlier. To pass the night, the actress recounts an older tale of a farming couple who take in a troubled young drifter as a series of grisly murders spreads fear across the frontier.

== Cast ==
- Nick Nolte
- Adelaide Clemens
- Ben Mendelsohn
- Scoot McNairy
- Emily Alyn Lind
- Caylee Cowan

== Production ==
In July 2026, it was announced that Casey Affleck had directed a gothic mystery film titled Company. Alongside the announcement, Nick Nolte, Adelaide Clemens, Ben Mendelsohn, Scoot McNairy, Emily Alyn Lind, and Caylee Cowan were also announced in the cast.

Principal photography took place in Whistler, British Columbia. Eight cinematographers are credit, including Masanobu Takayanagi, Lachlan Milne, Adam Arkapaw, Marcell Rév, Holger Jungnickel, Joaquin Baca Asay, Noah Fallis, and Affleck himself.

== Reception ==
On review aggregator Rotten Tomatoes, the film holds an approval rating of 47% based on 15 reviews, with an average rating of 5.6/10. Metacritic, which uses a weighted average, assigned the film a score of 44 out of 100, based on 11 critics, indicating "mixed or average reviews".
