= Angels Fallen: Warriors of Peace =

- Release poster
- Directed by: Ali Zamani
- Written by: Chris Kato
- Story by: Ali Zamani
- Produced by: Zeus Zamani
- Starring: Denise Richards; Cuba Gooding Jr.; Randy Couture; William McNamara; Arifin Putra
- Cinematography: Artur Gubin
- Music by: Christian Davis
- Production companies: AZ Film Studios; Bossa Nova Productions; Eleven Seven Productions; Millman Productions; Ron Lee Productions; Silent D Pictures
- Distributed by: Uncork'd Entertainment
- Release date: July 9, 2024
- Country: United States
- Language: English

Angels Fallen: Warriors of Peace is a 2024 American action adventure horror fantasy film written by Chris Kato, directed by Ali Zamani and starring Cuba Gooding Jr. It is the sequel to the 2020 film Angels Fallen.

The film was released digitally on July 9, 2024.

== Plot ==
Called by a higher power, an Iraq War veteran embarks on a mission to stop a fallen angel from raising an army of the dead to take over the world.

== Cast ==
- Denise Richards as Deborah
- Cuba Gooding Jr. as Balthazar
- Randy Couture as Marcus
- William McNamara as Roman
- Arifin Putra as Trigger
- Lee Kholafai as Paul
- Korrina Rico as Leah
- Josh Burdett as Gabriel
- Michael Teh as Michael
- Caitlin O'Connor as Olivia
- Silvio Simac as Lucius
- Greg Canestrari as Padre
- Ken Davitian as Armen
- Tehran Von Ghasri as Barnabus

== Production ==
In June 2022, it was announced that Richards and Putra were cast in the film and that filming would commence in Los Angeles in August 2022.

In March 2023, it was announced that Gooding Jr. and Couture joined the cast and that the film was "currently in production in Los Angeles."

== Release ==
Angels Fallen: Warriors of Peace was released digitally on July 9, 2024. it reached the top spot on the Amazon Prime Movies chart in November 2024 and held the position for three weeks in the U.S.
