= Frank and Penelope =

2022 film by Sean Patrick Flannery

- Theatrical release poster
- Directed by: Sean Patrick Flanery
- Written by: John Thaddeus (story by), Sean Patrick Flanery (screenplay)
- Produced by: Tom Brady; William Shockley; Allen Gilmer; Scott Dolezal
- Starring: Caylee Cowan; Billy Budinich; Kevin Dillon; Donna D'Errico; Johnathon Schaech; Lin Shaye; Charley Koontz; Sean Patrick Flanery
- Cinematography: A.J. Raitano
- Edited by: Chris Patterson
- Music by: Rhyan D'Errico; Jared Forman
- Production company: Rosebud studios
- Release date: June 3, 2022
- Running time: 90 minutes
- Country: United States

Frank and Penelope is a 2022 American romantic crime film written and directed by Sean Patrick Flanery. The film stars Billy Budinich, Caylee Cowan, Kevin Dillon, Donna D'Errico, Lin Shaye, Johnathon Schaech, and Sean Patrick Flanery. The film is a road movie that begins in the city of Austin, Texas traveling along a deserted stretch of dirt road miles from civilization. It then takes place in the ghost town of Terlingua, Texas which devolves into chaos and violence after it is discovered that the proprietor of the motel and diner, Chisos, is a psychotic cannibal along with his sadistic family. Frank and Penelope suddenly become immersed in a hellish nightmare, on a life and death journey, where escape is just a heart-pounding breath away.

Frank & Penelope had its world premiere at the Riviera International Film Festival in Italy on May 14, 2022. It's also been screened as part of the Cannes Film Festival market where Fabrication Films acquired film rights. Frank & Penelope was theatrically released in the United States on June 3, 2022.

== Plot ==
The film opens on Frank, a down on luck man, who has his heart broken after he catches his wife cheating on him. He has always followed the rules and now he is going to start living for himself and taking all the risks he never took before. This sends Frank down a path to the run-down strip club, where he meets Penelope, a dancer who works there. Penelope works at the run-down strip club under the management of her boss. The two have been running a system with the intent to steal from clients, she sees Frank as an easy mark, before falling for him, as someone who could help her escape this world. Those events kick off Frank and Penelope's ride-or-die journey across east Texas. Their offbeat road trip eventually leads them to a sadistic cult leader named Chisos.

== Cast ==
- Billy Budinich as Frank
- Caylee Cowan as Penelope
- Kevin Dillon as Sheriff
- Donna D'Errico as Mabel
- Johnathon Schaech as Chisos
- Lin Shaye as Ophelia
- Sean Patrick Flanery as Club Manager
- Charley Koontz as Cookie
- Sonya Eddy as Nurse
- Sydney Scotia as Molly
- Mike Bash as Chad
- Brian Maillard as Cleve
- Jade Lorna Sullivan as Magda
- Cherilyn Wilson as Becky
- Raymond Abel as Orderly

== Production ==
Written by John Thaddeus. Screenplay by Sean Patrick Flanery, Frank and Penelope was produced by Tom Brady, William Shockley, Allen Gilmer, Scott Dolezal, and Sean Patrick Flanery.

=== Filming ===
Filming began on July 12, 2021, in Terlingua, Texas with locations including an abandoned mercury mine and was completed on August 11, 2021.

== Release ==
=== Theatrical ===
The film had its world premiere at the Riviera International Film Festival in Italy on May 14, 2022. It was released in the United States on June 3, 2022, by Redbud Studios and Fabrication Films.

=== Home media ===
Frank and Penelope was released digitally and on Blu-ray and DVD on July 3, 2022.

== Reception ==
=== Critical response ===
Chris Vognar of the Houston Chronicle criticized the film, arguing that the film has a "ugliness of spirit" that gets more severe as it continues, stating that the writing "lacks momentum", and stating that the work of the actors "barely scrapes by".
