= The Away Game =

2006 television documentary

The Away Game is a 2006 television documentary that follows the lives of a number of Australian football players based overseas. The documentary was based on the book of the same name by Matthew Hall.

== The Away Game ==
First broadcast on Special Broadcasting Service (SBS) and later screening on the National Geographic Channel throughout Australia, The Away Game is a documentary that takes viewers behind the match highlights to show you what life is really like for Australia's football superstars: their lives, their loves, their obsessions.

From sharing lunch with John Aloisi in Spain, to enjoying a round of PlayStation with Tim Cahill and discussing the meaning of life - and the microwave - with Harry Kewell, the 52-minute show takes you from England to the Netherlands, to Switzerland, Spain and Italy.

Narrated by Anthony LaPaglia, a former professional footballer with Adelaide City, The Away Game explores the realities of life as a Socceroo in Europe, as well as the lesser-known athletes who are doing what they love, albeit thousands of kilometres from home.

== Featuring ==
Jason Culina, Tony Vidmar, Tony Popovic, Archie Thompson, Ljubo Milicevic, Zeljko Kalac, Vince Grella, Mark Bresciano, John Aloisi, Josip Skoko, Lucas Neill, Mark Schwarzer, Tim Cahill, Harry Kewell, Brett Emerton, Mile Sterjovski, Hayden Doyle, John Filan, Mark Hughes, Dimitry Piterman, Guus Hiddink, Christian Gross, Graham Arnold, Joe Marston and Craig Johnston.

== Production Details ==
The show is produced by Soda Presents and Last Straw Productions, executive produced and narrated by Anthony LaPaglia. Director: Scott Ferguson, produced by Anita Bulan, Matthew Hall, Scott Ferguson, Director of Photography is Lachlan Milne.

The crew consisted of Anita Bulan, Matthew Hall, Scott Ferguson and Lachlan Milne. They drove a Kia Sedona from London's Heathrow Airport through Europe, clocking up 14,000 km in their four-week journey.

The Away Game is based on the book of the same name by Matthew Hall (Hardie Grant, 2006). The show is credited for being the first to publicly state that Mark Bresciano's name was not Marco.

== The DVD ==
The DVD, distributed by Visual Entertainment Group, includes extras such as:

Meet the Players
A Second Language
A few quick questions
The Adoring fans
Graham Arnold uncut: "What it meant to qualify"
Some advice: "A reality check"
Craig Johnston uncut: "How I got to Liverpool"

== Broadcasts ==
The Away Game was first broadcast during the 2006 FIFA World Cup on SBS Television in Australia. It has since been broadcast by the National Geographic Channel and featured as inflight entertainment on Qantas Airways and Cathay Pacific since June 2006.

== Awards ==
The documentary was nominated for Best Profiling of a Team, Sport or Athlete at the Australian Sports Commission media awards, was awarded a "highly commended" for Lachlan Milne's work at the ACT/NSW Cinematographers Society Awards, and won "Best Cinematography" at the 26th Palermo International Sports Film Festival in Italy.
