= Ali Zamani =

Film director

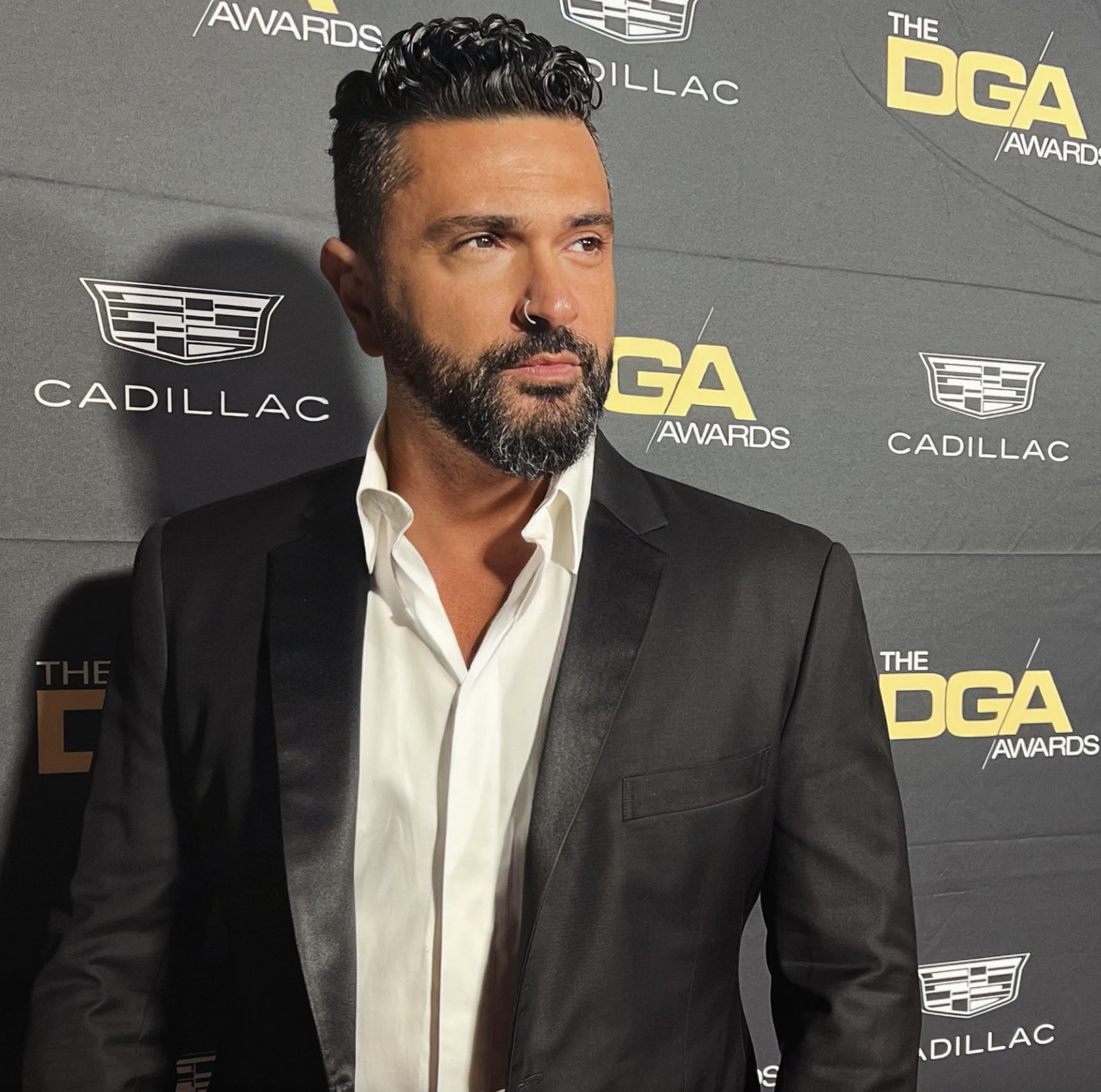
- Born: 11 October 1980 (age 46)
- Education: Northbrook College; California State University
- Occupations: Film director; writer
- Notable work: Angels Fallen: Warriors of Peace; C.I.Ape; Incision (film); Angels Fallen; Opus of an Angel
- Website: alizamani.com

Ali Zamani (born 11 October 1980) is a film director and writer. He is the founder of Golden Dunes Dubai International Film Festival and AZ Filmz, a film, commercial and music video production company.

== Early life and education ==
Zamani was raised in Gothenburg, Sweden.

During his teenage, Zamani participated in theater and drama classes. He pursued formal education in filmmaking, earning a Higher National Diploma (HND) in Video Production from Bournemouth University in 1999. He then obtained a Bachelor of Arts degree in Film, Video, Media, and Society from Northbrook College, Sussex, in 2002. While at Northbrook, one of his short films was selected for screening at the Duke of York's Cinema in Brighton.

Zamani moved to the United States, where he earned a master's degree in mass communication and Screenwriting from California State University, Northridge, in 2004.

== Career ==
=== AZ Filmz ===
While being a student at Northbrook College, Zamani founded AZ Filmz in 1998 and registered as an LLC in 2004. AZ Productions focuses on producing artistic, films and music videos. The company also supports emerging musicians by creating professional-grade music videos.

=== Music videos and commercials ===
Zamani has directed over 300 music videos for prominent artists, including Snoop Dogg, Enrique Iglesias, T-Pain, Lil Wayne, French Montana, Drake, P. Diddy, Sean Kingston, Baby Bash, and Faith Evans. He also directed the music video for Tiana Kocher's 2018 single "Just My Type", which features a comedic face-to-face scene between actors Marlon Wayans and Rob Schneider.

=== Feature films ===
Zamani's debut feature film, Opus of an Angel, was a personal project developed over three years. The film, starring William McNamara and Kaylynn Kubeldis, tells the story of a grieving cardiologist who finds new purpose after meeting a blind girl. Zamani worked with Junior Blind of America to cast an authentic blind actress for the role, ultimately selecting Kubeldis. The film premiered at multiple international festivals, winning multiple awards before its digital release on July 28.

Following Opus of an Angel, Zamani directed Angels Fallen, an action-adventure film starring Michael Madsen and Nicholas Turturro, shot in Macedonia. A sequel, Angels Fallen: Warriors of Peace, was released in 2024, featuring Cuba Gooding Jr., Denise Richards, and Randy Couture.

In early 2026, he completed directing the murder mystery feature film The Mystery of the Golden Spear, starring Mischa Barton. He also wrote and directed Angels in Darkness, a film featuring Ron Perlman, Cuba Gooding Jr., and James Oliver Whitley, which is in post-production.

== Notable works ==
=== As director ===
Sources:

- Angels Fallen: Warriors of Peace (2024)
- C.I.Ape (2022)
- Twisted Little Lies (2021)
- Incision (2020)
- Hacked (2020)
- Angels Fallen (2019)
- Opus of an Angel (2017)
- EuroClub (2016)
- Maul Dogs (2015)

=== As writer ===
- Angels Fallen: Warriors of Peace (2024)
- Opus of an Angel (2017)

=== As producer ===
- The Last Exorcist (2020)
- Escape: Puzzle of Fear as executive producer (2020)
- Coven (2020)
- American Exorcism as executive producer (2017)
