= Holiday Twist =

2023 film by Stephanie Garvin

- Theatrical release poster
- Directed by: Stephanie Garvin
- Written by: Stephanie Garvin
- Produced by: Stephanie Garvin; Scott Rosenfelt; Chad Oliver
- Starring: Kelly Stables; Emily Tosta; Caylee Cowan; Brian Thomas Smith; James Maslow; Hugh Sheridan; Drew Fuller; Neal McDonough; Sean Astin
- Cinematography: Drew Suppa
- Edited by: Devon Greene; Jason Luna-Ballantyne
- Music by: Steve Dorff
- Production company: ETM Pictures
- Distributed by: ETM Distribution
- Release date: December 1, 2023
- Country: United States
- Language: English

Holiday Twist is a 2023 American Christmas comedy film written and directed by Stephanie Garvin. It stars Kelly Stables, Neal McDonough, Sean Astin, Caylee Cowan, James Maslow, and Hugh Sheridan.

== Cast ==
- Kelly Stables as Connie
- Neal McDonough as Skip
- Sean Astin as Mr. Whitmer
- Emily Tosta as Brooke
- Brian Thomas Smith as Boogie
- Blake Leeper as Santa Rex
- Caylee Cowan as Christina Christmas
- James Maslow as Sam
- Hugh Sheridan as George
- Bastiano Ferrari as Phillip
- Sadie Stratton as Jennifer
- Jake Miller as Kyle
- Haley Reinhart as Anna
- Melody Thornton as Brenda
- Kelly Mi Li as Amanda
- Montana Tucker as Cheryl
- Stephanie Garvin as Melanie Watkins
- Tess Murphy as Stella
- Hudson Barry as Stuart
- Callan Barry as Henry
- Berkeley James as Brianna
- Kellen Patino as Brant
- Drew Fuller as Bill Neilson
- Jeff Rector as Vance Jordan
- Jasmine Rossi as Jessica

== Production ==
In June 2022, it was reported that Sean Astin, Neal McDonough, and Haley Reinhart would join the cast in supporting roles, and that filming would take place in Los Angeles.

== Release ==
Holiday Twist was released in over 500 theaters in the United States by ETM Distribution on December 1, 2023.
