= Hayden Doyle =

Australian footballer

Personal information
- Full name: Hayden James Doyle
- Date of birth: 25 February 1989 (age 37)
- Place of birth: Adelaide, Australia
- Height: 1.84 m (6 ft 0 in)
- Position: Defender

Team information
- Current team: Quinns FC

Youth career
- Croydon Kings
- 2005–2007: Stoke City

Senior career*
Years	Team	Apps	(Gls)
2007–2008	Niki Volos	5	(0)
2008–2010	Perth Glory	4	(0)
2009	→ Mandurah City (loan)		
2010	→ Perth SC (loan)		
2010	Mandurah City		
2011	Bentleigh Greens	13	(4)
2011–2013	Oakleigh Cannons	52	(10)
2014	Stirling Lions	21	(4)
2015–2016	Bayswater City	11	(4)
2021	Dianella White Eagles	4	(0)
2021	Fremantle City	10	(2)
2022–	Quinns FC	11	(5)
- * Club domestic league appearances and goals as of 19 September 2022

Hayden James Doyle (born 25 February 1989 in Adelaide, Australia) is an Australian footballer.

== Career ==
Doyle grew up playing junior football in Bunbury before moving to England aged 16 to join Stoke City's youth academy. After not managing to break into the first team at Stoke, Doyle joined Greek Third Division side Niki Volos. On 20 June 2008, Doyle returned to Australia to join Perth Glory, the club he had supported since he was a young boy. He debuted for Perth Glory 17 August 2008 in a 1–0 loss against Adelaide United in the 2008-2009 A-League season.

In 2011, he signed Oakleigh Cannons in the Victorian Premier League.

== Trivia ==
While at Stoke City in 2006, Doyle featured in Australia's Football Documentary The Away Game.
