= Sunrise in Heaven =

2019 film by Waymon Boone

- Theatrical release poster
- Directed by: Waymon Boone
- Written by: Dan Benamor
- Based on: His Sunrise My Sunset by Jan Hurst
- Produced by: Dureyshevar; Nat Mundel; Jack Nasser; Jacob Nasser; Joseph Nasser
- Starring: Caylee Cowan; Travis Burns; Corbin Bernsen; Dee Wallace; Erin Bethea; Jenn Gotzon Chandler
- Cinematography: Patrice Lucien Cochet
- Edited by: Sean Cain
- Music by: Kent Rock
- Production company: Nasser Entertainment
- Distributed by: Cinedigm
- Release date: April 9, 2019
- Running time: 90 minutes
- Country: United States

Sunrise in Heaven (also known as Forever Love) is a 2019 American romance direct-to-video film directed by Waymon Boone and written by Dan Benamor. The film stars Caylee Cowan, Corbin Bernsen, Dee Wallace, Travis Burns, Erin Bethea, and Jenn Gotzon Chandler. It is based on His Sunrise My Sunset, a 2016 romance novel by American author Jan Hurst. Hurst was inspired to write the faith-based book after the car crash that killed her husband, Steve.

== Plot ==
The film is based on the life of Jan Hurst. In the film, Jan is the daughter of an overly protective military father, but that doesn't stop her from falling in love with Steve, a young Air Force airman.

The film is interspersed with scenes from the present day and flashbacks to when Jan and Steve met. In the present day, a devastating car crash leaves Steve on life support. As Jan reflects on their courtship and their faith as a pillar of this she works to come to terms with the situation and support their (Jan and Steve's) daughters.

In the flashbacks, their relationship begins in a cafeteria where Jan is serving food. Initially, Jan is outwardly resistant to Steve's charm, although the teasing from her friends indicates she may be slightly infatuated. Over time, Jan shows she is attracted to Steve and eventually accepts his invitation to a date. They grow closer as they begin to know each other and are shown to be falling for one another.

The situation is complicated by Jan's father, who is very resistant to the idea of his daughter being involved with a military man. When the couple starts seeing each other, Jan tells them Steve is a student, a partial lie as Steve is enrolled in a paper. As their relationship develops, Jan's father discovers the deception and attempts to stop them from seeing one another.

Steve is assigned to a remote base and tells Jan that he wants to marry her before he goes. Jan tells Steve that despite the situation, she won't marry him without her father's permission.

Steve attempts to win Jan's father over but is unsuccessful. Jan tells her father she will never forgive him. Jan's mother speaks with Jan's father and reminds him of their courtship, how young they were, and the opposition they faced. Following this conversation, Jan's father speaks with Steve on base and gives his blessing.

Jan and Steve are married with their family and friends around them in a beautiful ceremony.

Present-day Steve has been going downhill since the accident. Jan asks Steve for a sign on what to do, and he makes eye contact with her. Jan lets her daughters know she understands that Steve is ready to leave.

The pastor who married Jan and Steve and counselled Jan in their early relationship, leads the family through their farewell prayers. Ultimately, they let Steve know it was okay for him to go.

In the final scene, Jan stands with her daughters outside what is assumed to be her house with Steve. Her daughters ask if she is okay, and she tells them she thinks she will be.

== Cast ==
- Caylee Cowan as Jan
  - Bonnie Burroughs as Adult Jan
- Travis Burns as Steve
  - Randy Crowder as Adult Steve
- Corbin Bernsen as Jim
- Dee Wallace as Marion
- Erin Bethea as Michele
- Jenn Gotzon Chandler as Terri
- Connor McRaith as Robbie
- Aitana Rinab as Julie

== Production ==
Written by Dan Benamor, Sunrise in Heaven was produced by Dureyshevar, Nat Mundel, Jack Nasser, Jacob Nasser and Joseph Nasser, and line produced by Bochen Zhang. A trailer for the film was released on February 6, 2019. It was released on April 9, 2019, on DVD and video-on-demand.

=== Filming ===
Filming began on June 25, 2018, in Los Angeles, California and was completed on July 10, 2018.
