= John Powers Middleton =

American film and television producer

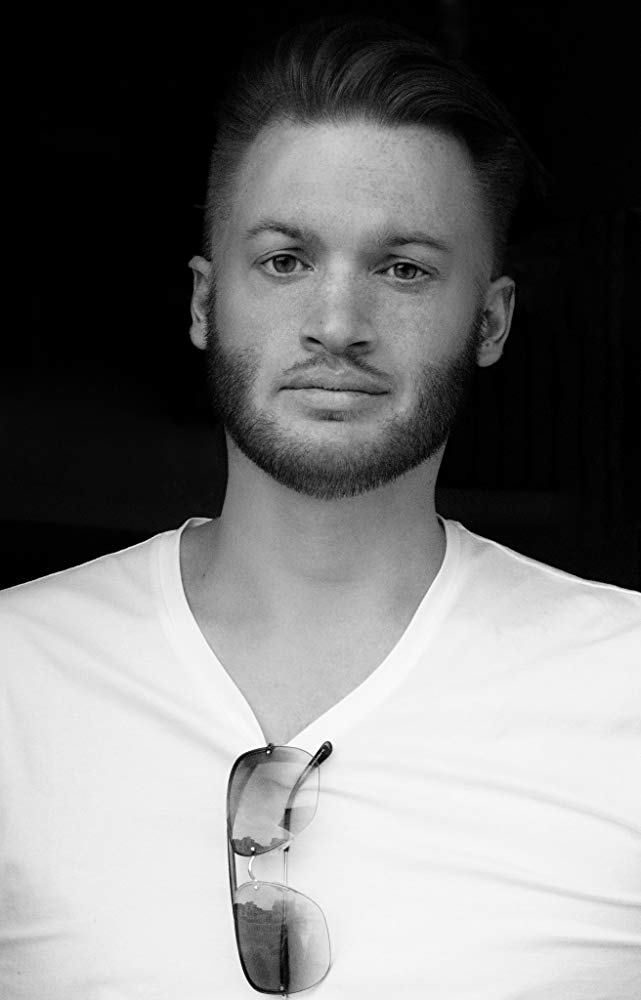
- Middleton in 2017
- Born: January 1, 1984 (age 42); Philadelphia, Pennsylvania, U.S.
- Education: Duke University; University of Pennsylvania
- Occupations: Film producer, television producer
- Years active: 2010–present
- Employer(s): The Middleton Media Group, The Affleck/Middleton Project, Vertigo Entertainment, Good Universe, Warner Brothers Entertainment, Univision Radio

John Powers Middleton (born January 1, 1984) is an American film and television producer. He began his film career as an executive producer for Oldboy (2013) before executive producing the A&E television series, Bates Motel (2013), and co-producing The Lego Movie (2014). Middleton's production company, The Affleck/Middleton Project, produced the film Manchester by the Sea (2016), which was nominated for six Oscars, including Best Picture. The film won Oscars for Best Original Screenplay and Best Actor.

Middleton was co-producer on the animated action-adventure film, The Lego Batman Movie (2017), which won or has been nominated for over 80 awards. He also served as an executive producer on The Disaster Artist (2017), which was chosen by the National Board of Review as one of the top ten films of 2017. At the 75th Golden Globe Awards, James Franco won the award for Best Actor – Musical or Comedy for his role in the film, which was also nominated for Best Motion Picture – Musical or Comedy. Franco received a nomination for Outstanding Performance by a Male Actor in a Leading Role at the 24th Screen Actors Guild Awards, and the film earned a nomination for Best Adapted Screenplay at the 90th Academy Awards.

In 2023, Middleton executive produced the animated feature Nimona, which garnered nominations for Best Animated Feature at the Critics' Choice Awards, Annie Awards, and Academy Awards.

As of 2024, Middleton's 30 films and 2 television series have a cumulative box office of $1.59 billion. These projects have been nominated for 1,008 awards, winning 314, including 9 Academy Award nominations (with 2 wins) and 8 Golden Globe nominations (with 2 wins).

Middleton is also a co-owner of the Philadelphia Phillies baseball team.

== Early life ==
John Powers Middleton is from Philadelphia, Pennsylvania. He is the son of John S. Middleton, principal owner and general partner of the Philadelphia Phillies. Middleton attended The Haverford School and later enrolled at Duke University and The University of Pennsylvania prior to pursuing a career in film.

== Career ==
John Powers Middleton began his career as an intern, assistant, and script supervisor for a number of companies and productions before partnering with Roy Lee under his Vertigo Entertainment banner in the fall of 2010. In 2012, Middleton created and launched The Alfonso Aguilar Show, a 2-hour, drive time, nationally syndicated show on Univision Radio, and the first nationally syndicated conservative, Spanish language talk show in history. In February 2013, Middleton and Lee entered a joint venture with Joe Drake and Nathan Kahane to launch Good Universe, an independent full-service film financing, production, and global sales company.

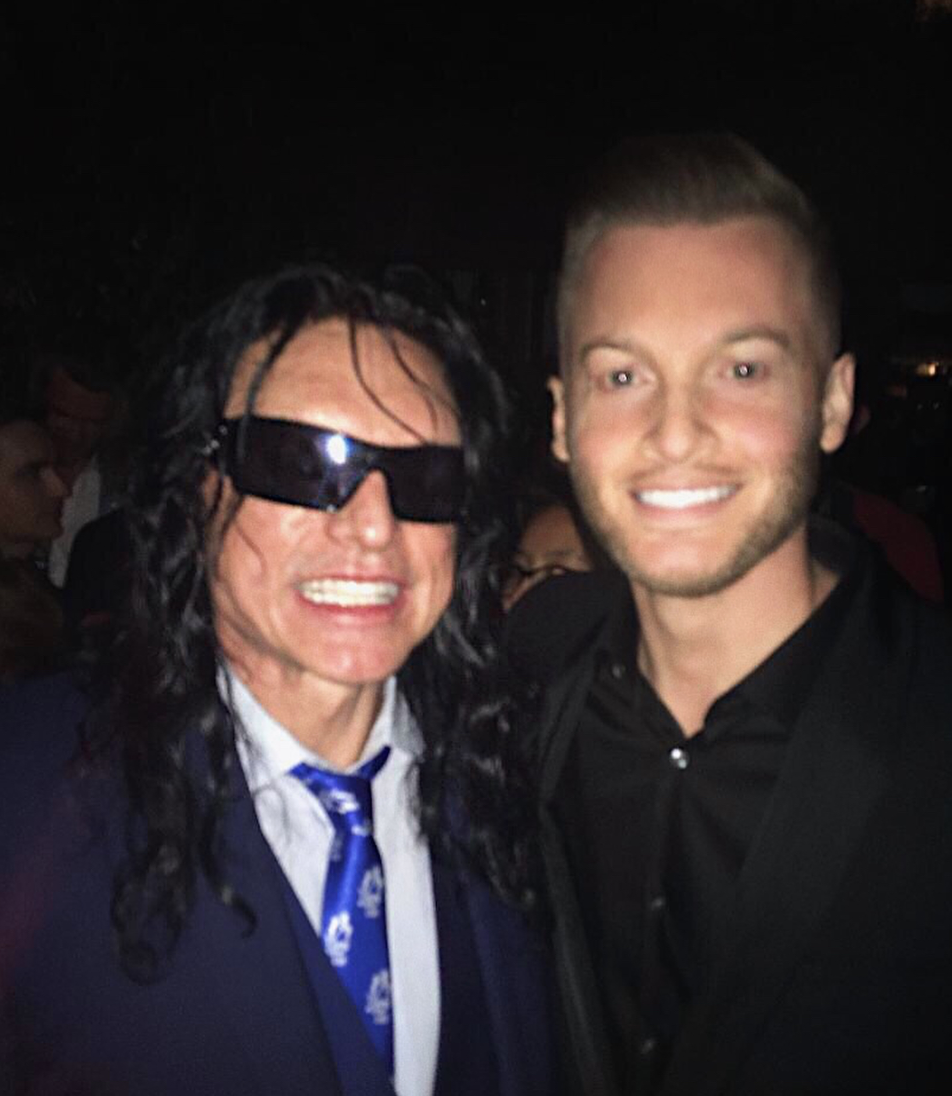
John Powers Middleton with Tommy Wiseau, The Disaster Artist

John Powers Middleton and Casey Affleck formed a production company, The Affleck/Middleton Project, in June 2014. While running the production company, Middleton continued to produce with Vertigo Entertainment, Good Universe, Univision Radio, Warner Brothers Entertainment, and Fox 21 Television Studios, the latter of which he left for Warner Bros. Television.

Through these partnerships Middleton produced: The Lego Movie (2014), the A&E show Bates Motel, a reboot of the classic horror film Poltergeist, the Liam Neeson/Ed Harris thriller Run All Night, and Spike Lee's Oldboy, among others. He also worked on Manchester by the Sea, which starred his producing partner, Casey Affleck. The film was named the second best movie of 2016 by Rolling Stone, and 2016 film of the year by the National Board of Review. Middleton was a co-producer on The Lego Batman Movie (2017) and The Lego Ninjago Movie (2017), and has also worked on the new Stephen King adaptation of It. In the future, he will produce The Stand, many Lego film sequels and the film adaptation of the video game Minecraft. Middleton was an executive producer on The Disaster Artist (2017), which was nominated for two Golden Globe Awards, including the Best Musical or Comedy Motion Picture. The film won the Best Actor in a Musical or Comedy. The film was also nominated at the 2018 Oscars for Best Adapted Screenplay.

During the 2017 and 2018 award season, two of Middleton's five films received recognition, including The Lego Batman Movie which received a total of 41 nominations and The Disaster Artist received a total of 44 nominations across multiple categories and ceremonies.

== Political life ==
Middleton is active in Republican fundraising, political strategy, the youth movement, and media, with his first effort in creating and producing The Alfonso Aguilar Show. He served as national co-chair for a year, from age 25, of the Republican National Committee's Young Eagles program. In support of the Republican Party, Middleton has hosted a variety of events, including a 2015 fundraising event for the Jeb Bush candidacy for the Republican nomination in the 2016 United States presidential election.

As of June 2016, John Powers Middleton was the top donor to Donald Trump's 2016 presidential campaign.

== Filmography ==
Film
Year	Title	Credit
2013	Oldboy	Executive Producer
2013	Undroppable	Producer
2014	Flight 7500	Executive producer
2014	The Lego Movie	Co-producer
2014	The Voices	Executive producer
2014	The Woman in Black 2	Executive producer
2015	Hidden	Executive producer
2015	Poltergeist	Executive producer
2015	Run All Night	Executive producer
2016	The Boy	Executive producer
2016	Manchester by the Sea	Special Thanks
2017	Can't Take it Back	Executive producer
2017	Death Note	Executive producer
2017	Sleepless	Executive producer
2017	The Disaster Artist	Executive producer
2017	The Lego Batman Movie	Co-producer
2017	The Lego Ninjago Movie	Co-producer
2018	Extinction	Executive producer
2018	The Stand	Executive producer
2019	Always Be My Maybe	Executive producer
2019	Good Boys	Executive producer
2019	Light of My Life	Producer
2019	Long Shot	Executive producer
2019	The Grudge	Executive producer
2020	Desperados	Executive producer
2020	The Turning	Executive producer
2023	Nimona	Executive producer
2024	The Waterboyz	Executive producer

Television
Year	Title	Credit
2013–2017	Bates Motel	Executive producer (2013–2014); Consulting producer (2015–2017)
2022	Women of the Movement	Executive producer

Radio
Year	Title	Credit
2012–present	The Alfonso Aguilar Show	Creator, producer

== Controversy ==
Middleton owns two properties in the Hollywood Hills that were attacked by trespassers and vandals on September 18 and 21, 2024. The vandals tagged both houses wall to wall with graffiti, which became an international news story.

Both mansions were repainted and repaired within a week.
