= Caitlin O'Connor =

American actress, model, film producer and TV host

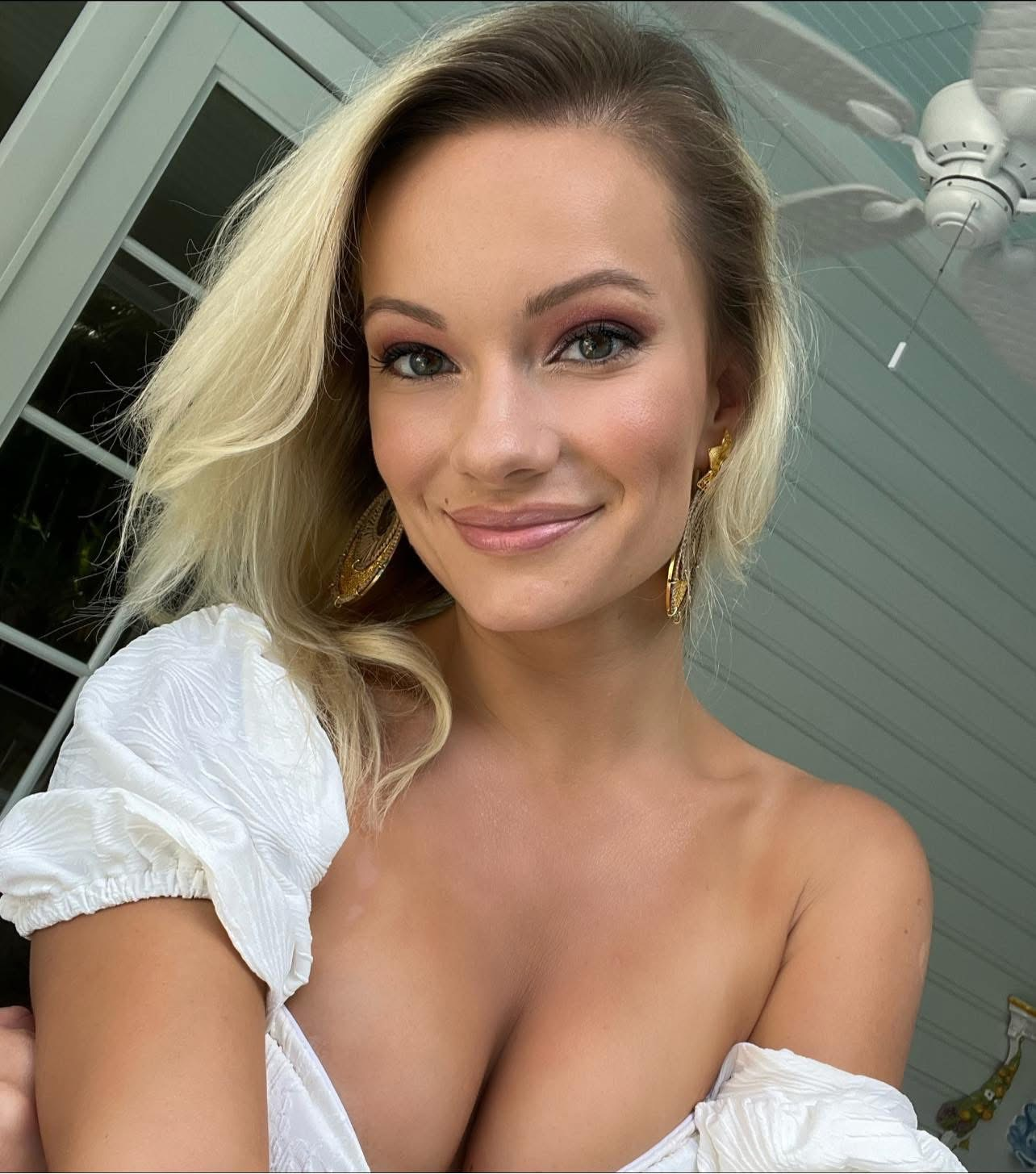
- O'Connor in 2022
- Born: Caitlin O'Connor Purdy; August 3, 1989 (age 37); Los Angeles, California, U.S.
- Education: University of California, Los Angeles
- Occupations: Celebrity, Model, Presenter, Producer
- Years active: 2008–present
- Height: 168 cm (5 ft 6 in)
- Partner(s): Joe Manganiello (2023–present; engaged)
- Website: Official website

Caitlin O'Connor Purdy (born August 3, 1989) is an American actress, television host, model, and film producer. She is a member of the Producers Guild of America.

== Career ==
O'Connor guest starred on the series finale of Two and a Half Men on CBS. She has also guest starred on Winning Time as Dyan Cannon, and on Comedy Central's Tosh.0 as well as Key & Peele. As a commercial actress, O'Connor starred in a national commercial for Dave & Busters and PepsiNext. Her print campaign credits include Target, Macy's, Xbox, and Pert Plus. As a host, Caitlin O'Connor has regular assignments at E! News, Maxim, Arsenic, The Chive, and AfterBuzz TV.

== Personal life ==
O'Connor was born in Los Angeles, and raised in Uniontown, Pennsylvania, where she graduated high school. She moved back to Los Angeles at age 17 to attend UCLA as an English major. She was UCLA's BruinBearWear catalog model and worked her first job at Disneyland as a Disney princess and character actress. She is of Irish, English, and Hungarian descent. O'Connor loves combat sports and has worked as a ring girl or correspondent for Top Rank Boxing, UFC Fight Pass, GoldenBoy Boxing, BKB Boxing, and was the ring girl in the 2015 feature film Southpaw.

Since September 2023, she has been in a relationship with Joe Manganiello. In October 2025, Manganiello announced that he and O'Connor are engaged. In December 2025, the couple moved from Los Angeles, California to Pittsburgh, Pennsylvania where they both grew up.

== Filmography, television roles, and appearances ==
Filmography, TV roles, and appearances
Year	Title	Role	Notes
2008	Factory	The Builtgood Girl	(TV Series)
2009	Don't Let Her Pull You Down	Zombie	(Short) as Caitlin O'Connor Purdy
2010	Entourage	Flight Attendant	(TV Series)
2011	Neighbros	Lesbian #1	(TV Movie)
2011	Be Who You Are	Boarding School Student	(Short)
2012	The Wolf	Jen	(Short)
2012	October 31	Vamp Girl	(Short)
2012	Comedy Sketch TV Time, Okay?	Various Characters	(TV Series)
2013	7 Lives Xposed	Jasmine	(TV Series)
2013	Key & Peele	Samantha - Episode #3.7	(TV Series)
2013	Heaven & Earth: No Money No Love	Bunny	(Video short)
2013	Tumbleweed	Mirabelle (2013)	(TV Mini-Series)
2015	Two and a Half Men	Beautiful Girl	(TV Series)
2015	Comedy Bang! Bang!	Dream Babe	(TV Series)
2015	The Slice	Sister Theresa	(TV Movie)
2012 - 2016	Tosh.0	Girl in Tree/ Horseshoe/ Cheerleader	(TV Series)
2016	American Satan	Raven	(Feature Film)
2023	Porterville	Gracie	(Feature Film)
2024	Angels Fallen: Warriors of Peace	Olivia	(Feature Film)
