= Casey Affleck =

American actor (born 1975)

- Affleck at the 83rd Venice International Film Festival in 2026
- Born: Caleb Casey McGuire Affleck-Boldt; August 12, 1975 (age 51); Falmouth, Massachusetts, U.S.
- Occupations: Actor; filmmaker
- Years active: 1988–present
- Spouse: Summer Phoenix (m. 2006; div. 2017)
- Partner: Caylee Cowan (2021–present)
- Children: 2
- Relatives: Ben Affleck (brother); Violet Affleck (niece)
- Awards: Full list

Casey Affleck (born Caleb Casey McGuire Affleck-Boldt; August 12, 1975) is an American actor. He is the recipient of various accolades, including an Academy Award, a BAFTA Award, and a Golden Globe Award. The younger brother of actor Ben Affleck, he began his career as a child actor, appearing in the PBS television film Lemon Sky (1988). He later appeared in three Gus Van Sant films: To Die For (1995), Good Will Hunting (1997), Gerry (2002), and in Steven Soderbergh's Ocean's film series (2001–2007). His first leading role was in Steve Buscemi's independent comedy-drama Lonesome Jim (2006).

Affleck's breakthrough came in 2007, when he was nominated for the Academy Award for Best Supporting Actor for his performance as Robert Ford in the Western drama The Assassination of Jesse James by the Coward Robert Ford and starred in his brother's crime drama Gone Baby Gone. In 2010, he directed the mockumentary I'm Still Here. He went on to appear in Tower Heist (2011), ParaNorman (2012), and Interstellar (2014), and he received praise for his performance as an outlaw in Ain't Them Bodies Saints (2013).

In 2016, Affleck starred in the drama Manchester by the Sea, in which his performance as a grieving janitor earned him the Academy Award and the BAFTA Award for Best Actor. He has since starred in the dramas A Ghost Story (2017) and The Old Man & the Gun (2018), and as Boris Pash in the biographical thriller Oppenheimer (2023), his highest-grossing release.

== Early life and education ==
Caleb Casey McGuire Affleck-Boldt was born on August 12, 1975, in Falmouth, Massachusetts, to Christopher Anne "Chris" Boldt (1942 – June 2, 2026) and Timothy Byers Affleck (died 2026). The surname "Affleck" is of Scottish origin. He also has Irish, German, English, and Swedish ancestry. Affleck's maternal great-great-grandfather, Heinrich Boldt, known for the discovery of the Curmsun Disc, emigrated from Prussia in the late 1840s. His mother was a Radcliffe College- and Harvard-educated elementary school teacher. His father worked sporadically as an auto mechanic, a carpenter, a bookie, an electrician, a bartender, and a janitor at Harvard University. In the mid-1960s, he had been a stage manager, director, writer and actor with the Theater Company of Boston. During Affleck's childhood, his father was "a disaster of a drinker". Affleck first started acting by "reenacting what was happening at home" during role play exercises at Alateen meetings.

After his parents divorced when he was nine, Affleck and his older brother, Ben, lived with their mother and visited their father weekly. He learned to speak Spanish during a year spent traveling around Mexico with his mother and brother when he was ten. At the time, his brother Ben was filming The Second Voyage of the Mimi, which was set in Mexico. The two brothers spent "all of our time together, pretty much. Obviously at school we were in different grades, but we had the same friends." When Affleck was fourteen, his father moved to Indio, California, to enter a rehabilitation facility, and later worked there as an addiction counselor. He reconnected with his father during visits to California as a teenager: "I got to know him, really, because he was sober for the first time ... The man I knew before that was just completely different."

Growing up in a politically active, liberal household in Central Square, Cambridge, Affleck and his brother were surrounded by people who worked in the arts, were regularly taken to the theater by their mother, and were encouraged to make their own home movies. The brothers sometimes appeared in local weather commercials and as film extras because of their mother's friendship with a local casting director. Affleck acted in numerous high school theater productions while a student at Cambridge Rindge and Latin School. He has said he "wouldn't be an actor" if not for his high school theater teacher Gerry Speca: "He kind of turned me on to acting, why it can be fun, how it can be rewarding."

At age eighteen, Affleck moved to Los Angeles for a year to pursue an acting career, and lived with his brother and their childhood friend Matt Damon. Despite having "the best possible first experience" while filming To Die For, he spent much of the year working as a busboy at a restaurant in Pasadena. He decided to move to Washington, D.C., to study politics at George Washington University. He soon transferred to Columbia University in New York City, where he followed the Core Curriculum for a total of two years. However, he did not graduate: "I would do a semester of school, go do a movie ... Opportunities kept presenting themselves that were hard for me to turn down ... By then, I didn't really have roots at the school or a group of friends."

== Career ==
=== 1988–2006: Early work ===
Affleck acted professionally during his childhood due to his mother's friendship with a Cambridge-area casting director, Patty Collinge. In addition to local weather commercials and film extra work, he appeared as Kevin Bacon's brother in the PBS television film Lemon Sky (1988), directed by Collinge's husband Jan Egleson, and as a young Robert F. Kennedy in the ABC miniseries The Kennedys of Massachusetts (1990). These early acting experiences "meant nothing more than a day off from school" to Affleck, and he only began to consider a career as an actor when in high school. When he later moved to Los Angeles to pursue an acting career in earnest, his first film role was as a sociopathic teenager in Gus Van Sant's 1995 satirical comedy To Die For. During filming in Toronto, Affleck shared an apartment with co-star Joaquin Phoenix and they became close friends. Peter Travers of Rolling Stone praised Affleck's performance, saying he "skillfully capture[s] the pang of adolescence among no-hopers." However, Affleck then had a "disappointing" experience while making the 1996 drama Race the Sun and, "as soon as the film finished, I went to school."

While studying at Columbia, Affleck had a supporting role in Van Sant's Good Will Hunting (1997), written by his brother and their childhood friend Matt Damon. Despite arranging a first meeting between Van Sant and his brother to discuss the project, Affleck was reluctant to leave college temporarily to act in the film. He was eventually persuaded to play one of four friends living in South Boston – a role written specifically for him – and improvised many of his lines. Jay Carr of The Boston Globe praised the "emotional subtleties and variety" of the performances, and singled out "Casey Affleck's junior member of the quartet, dying to be taken as seriously as the others." Following the film's success, Affleck's career opportunities did not significantly improve. At the same time, his life became exposed to the public and parts of his life became "part of pop culture and public life." Also in 1997, he had a small role in Kevin Smith's Chasing Amy, starring his brother. He returned to university for a semester before quitting to focus on his acting career.

Affleck's career entered a "dark" period, with a series of supporting roles in critical and commercial failures. He later remarked: "It dawned on me late that I should be selective about what I do." In the independent comedy Desert Blue (1998), he starred opposite Kate Hudson as a small-town jock. Peter Stack of the San Francisco Chronicle felt that, while "interesting", his character was "entirely underdeveloped". In 1999, he made an uncredited appearance in the teen comedy American Pie and appeared as a punk rocker romantically involved with both Gaby Hoffmann and Christina Ricci's characters in the New Year's Eve ensemble comedy 200 Cigarettes. In the comedy Drowning Mona (2000), starring Danny DeVito, Affleck played a shy gardener suspected of murder. Elvis Mitchell of The New York Times acknowledged, in an otherwise negative review, that his role was "well played". Also in 2000, Affleck had a small role in the comedy Attention Shoppers and played Fortinbras in Ethan Hawke's Hamlet. He appeared as the brother of Heather Graham's character in the romantic comedy Committed (2000), with Emanuel Levy of Variety praising a "terrific" performance. Also in 2001, he had a small role in American Pie 2 and appeared in the teen slasher film Soul Survivors. Robert Koehler of Variety found him "bland" while Carla Meyer of the San Francisco Chronicle said that he did not make "much of an impression, [but may] have been too depressed to really act." One positive experience Affleck had during this period was working with Van Sant and cinematographer Harris Savides on Finding Forrester (2000) as Van Sant's assistant and technical consultant: "Can you imagine a better film school than that? Gus is not only somebody who I love a lot but is also who has taught me, maybe more than anybody else in film."

Affleck found a degree of commercial success when he was cast in Steven Soderbergh's heist comedy Ocean's Eleven (2001), starring George Clooney, Brad Pitt and Damon. In roles Soderbergh originally intended for Luke Wilson and Owen Wilson, Affleck and Scott Caan played Mormon brothers and wisecracking mechanics who help to rob three Las Vegas casinos simultaneously. While it was a "great, fun social experience", Affleck spent much of his time on set "being, like, 100 feet away from the camera in the background." He would later reprise his role in Ocean's Twelve (2004) and Ocean's Thirteen (2007).

In 2002, Affleck and Damon starred in Van Sant's experimental drama Gerry, playing two men who get lost while hiking in the desert. Affleck, Damon, and Van Sant conceived of the idea and wrote the screenplay together while living in neighboring New York apartments. The film, which had minimal dialogue, received mixed reviews. Affleck, who rarely watches his own films, said of Gerry in 2016: "That was an incredible experience. I saw one scene recently out of context at the Telluride Film Festival and I can't believe anyone ever sat through the whole thing. It probably works better as a whole but one scene lifted out – I thought, 'This is unbearable!'" Also in 2002, Affleck starred with Damon and then-girlfriend Summer Phoenix in a West End stage production of Kenneth Lonergan's This Is Our Youth. Lonergan and Affleck became friends during rehearsals, and Affleck later acted in workshop productions of Lonergan's plays in New York.

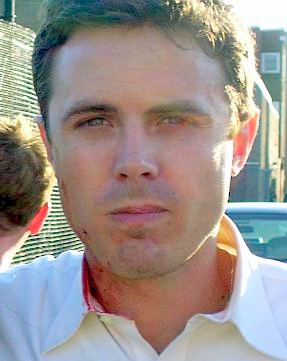
Affleck in 2006

Affleck's first leading role was in 2006's little-seen independent comedy-drama Lonesome Jim, directed by Steve Buscemi. He played a depressed writer who returns from New York to live with his parents in Indiana, and begins a relationship with Liv Tyler's character. Buscemi has said he knew Affleck would be able to carry the film after watching his performance in Gerry. Stephen Hunter of The Washington Post remarked: "Affleck's interesting .. He probably can't be a star in big movies because his drawback is a voice that sounds like a snivel drawn through a wet nasal passage into a whine ... And yet in certain kinds of films – this kind – he's 100 percent authentic." Ty Burr of The Boston Globe said Affleck "gets so far under the skin of this semi-charming jerk that the performance becomes both brave and aggravating." However, Stephen Holden of The New York Times felt it "would be a stronger movie if Mr. Affleck had the wherewithal to bare more of the passive-aggressive rage inside ... a more resourceful actor would have used this blank slate to scrawl a thousand telling details." Also in 2006, he had a supporting role in the romantic comedy The Last Kiss as a friend of Zach Braff's character.

=== 2007–2012: Breakthrough ===
Affleck had a breakthrough year in 2007, with the release of two films featuring critically acclaimed performances. The first of these performances was in the Western drama The Assassination of Jesse James by the Coward Robert Ford, in which he played Robert Ford to Brad Pitt's Jesse James. Affleck auditioned repeatedly for the role. While the director Andrew Dominik had seen Affleck in Gerry, he cast him partly because of his "beautiful-sounding voice. The voice is the thing that really gets you." Manohla Dargis of The New York Times described Affleck's performance as a "revelation" which "manages to make the character seem dumb and the actor wily and smart." Similarly, Claudia Puig of USA Today declared him a "real revelation [who] perfectly inhabits the role" while Todd McCarthy of Variety said Affleck made "an indelible impression as the insecure, physically unprepossessing weakling." Dana Stevens of Slate said "the movie belongs to Affleck [who] goes for broke in a wonderfully brave and weird performance as the craven naif Bob. Somehow he makes us want to flee this creep at top speed, even as we pray no harm will come to him." For his performance, Affleck was nominated for the Golden Globe Award, Screen Actors Guild Award and Academy Award for Best Supporting Actor.

While he was filming The Assassination of Jesse James by the Coward Robert Ford in Calgary, Affleck was visited by his brother, who offered him the leading role in his directorial project, the Boston crime thriller Gone Baby Gone (2007). While his brother was a first-time director and in the midst of a career downturn, Affleck had confidence in the project: "I felt like I knew him better than anyone else did." His performance, as an inexperienced private investigator tasked with finding a missing child, earned Affleck further plaudits for his acting. Manohla Dargis of The New York Times said: "I'm not sure exactly when Casey Affleck became such a good actor ... Most actors want you to love them, but [he] doesn't seem to know that, or maybe he doesn't care." Jim Ridley of The Village Voice described him as "a major talent coming into his own" while Mick LaSalle of the San Francisco Chronicle remarked that "the revelation is Casey Affleck, who heretofore has been a rather wormy, uncharismatic screen presence." Ty Burr of The Boston Globe commented: "I'd never stopped to consider Casey Affleck as a movie star before, but under his big brother's tutelage, he blooms as a leading man of richly watchable savvy and intelligence."

While The Assassination of Jesse James by the Coward Robert Ford and Gone Baby Gone were, respectively, a financial failure and a modest box office success, Affleck's acting career was widely believed to be at a turning point. However, he lost career momentum while directing I'm Still Here (2010), a divisive mockumentary about the musical career of his friend and then brother-in-law Joaquin Phoenix. While Affleck later clarified that it was "a planned, staged and scripted work of fiction", there was much media speculation during filming about whether Phoenix's public behavior was performance art or a genuine breakdown. Claudia Puig of USA Today remarked that, "whether truth or folly, it's not particularly well made. Even in the midst of Phoenix's most oddball and obsessive torment, it's boring ... What, exactly, is the point of a joke that nobody really gets?" Ty Burr of The Boston Globe described it as "an interesting but half-baked exercise in persona deconstruction, celebrity politics, and meta-meta-entertainment ... Parts of it are close to genius; most of it is actively torturous to watch." Kenneth Turan of the Los Angeles Times said the film "turns out to be much more interesting to speculate about than to actually watch." Reflecting on the experience in 2016, Affleck said: "We never thought people would actually think it was real ... In hindsight, we should have had a press junket and done talk shows and said how it was a mockumentary."

Affleck used his own money to fund I'm Still Here and, after running out of cash, filming was paused for a month to allow him to play a Texan serial killer in Michael Winterbottom's crime drama The Killer Inside Me (2010). Affleck later expressed regret over the film's graphic violence. Philip French of The Guardian found him "disturbingly brilliant" while Peter Travers of Rolling Stone praised "a mesmeric, implosively powerful performance." Mark Olsen of the Los Angeles Times said Affleck "showcases his uncanny ability to project a person holding two thoughts in his head at once, as he often gives away nothing in his face to convey the firestorm obviously raging in his soul." Affleck then had a supporting role in the heist comedy Tower Heist (2011) and voiced a character in the 2012 animation ParaNorman.

=== 2013–present: Wider recognition ===
After spending "a big chunk of time" directing I'm Still Here and dealing with the subsequent backlash, Affleck returned to regular acting work in 2013. "It was ugly for a minute ... I sort of remembered why I liked acting and I missed it." In David Lowery's Ain't Them Bodies Saints (2013), Affleck and Rooney Mara starred as outlaw lovers in 1970s-era Texas. Affleck was drawn to the opportunity to play a character who "was a much better person than anyone thought", after a string of roles as "assassins or murderers or just creeps". Shannon M. Houston of Paste described him as the film's "standout actor": "Down to his very jawline, Affleck captures the physicality and feeling of a sincerely romantic outlaw." Betsy Sharkey of the Los Angeles Times remarked: "Affleck plays conflicted souls so very well ... Here you wish for a criminal's redemption." Matt Pais of the Chicago Tribune said: "He has great instincts when it comes to morally compromised anti-heroes, and without trolling for our sympathy, Affleck's Bob is more than just a collection of behaviors; it's a smartly considered performance." Sebastian Doggart of The Guardian said he "shows himself again to be a master of the criminal outsider" while Chuck Wilson of The Village Voice found him "flat-out heartbreaking".

The opportunity to act opposite Christian Bale in the drama Out of the Furnace "reinvigorated" Affleck and reminded him why he enjoyed acting. Claudia Puig of USA Today found his performance as an Iraq War veteran dealing with posttraumatic stress disorder "completely captivating ... The chemistry between Bale and Affleck is powerful, intensifying the credibility of their brotherly bond." Matt Pais of the Chicago Tribune said Affleck "finds something fierce and noble in uneven material and in his character's rage. He's not like any other actor in American movies." Ann Hornaday of The Washington Post described the performance as "a searing portrayal of a young man who pushes himself to the punishing physical limit in search of both money and catharsis." Manohla Dargis of The New York Times remarked that Affleck "can come across as intensely vulnerable on screen, which nicely works for a broken man like Rodney." In 2014, Affleck and Jessica Chastain had supporting roles in Christopher Nolan's science fiction film Interstellar as the grown-up children of Matthew McConaughey's character, with Todd McCarthy of The Hollywood Reporter describing his character as "thinly developed". Also in 2014, Affleck and producer John Powers Middleton launched the production company, The Affleck/Middleton Project.

Affleck starred in three films in 2016, the first two of which underperformed financially. In John Hillcoat's crime thriller Triple 9, Affleck played an uncorruptible detective. Mick LaSalle of the San Francisco Chronicle said he "arrests our attention. I wonder if any other screen actor has ever seemed so focused and so distracted at the same time. He thinks more than he says, and so we listen, trying to get the part he's leaving out." Justin Chang of Variety described him as "one of the most persuasive leading men of his generation" while Brogan Morris of Paste declared him "maybe Hollywood's best offbeat leading man ... Few actors can suggest so much with such quiet precision, and even here Affleck is compulsively watchable despite his undercooked character." In Disney's disaster drama The Finest Hours, Affleck played a taciturn engineer on board a sinking ship. David Sims of The Atlantic said he "gives the kind of measured, thought-out performance he's so eminently capable of, even if the film isn't complex enough to rise to his level ... He animates an introverted character with subtle mental busywork whenever he's on the screen." Sheri Linden of The Hollywood Reporter noted that he "manages to turn his man of few words into the movie's most compelling figure."

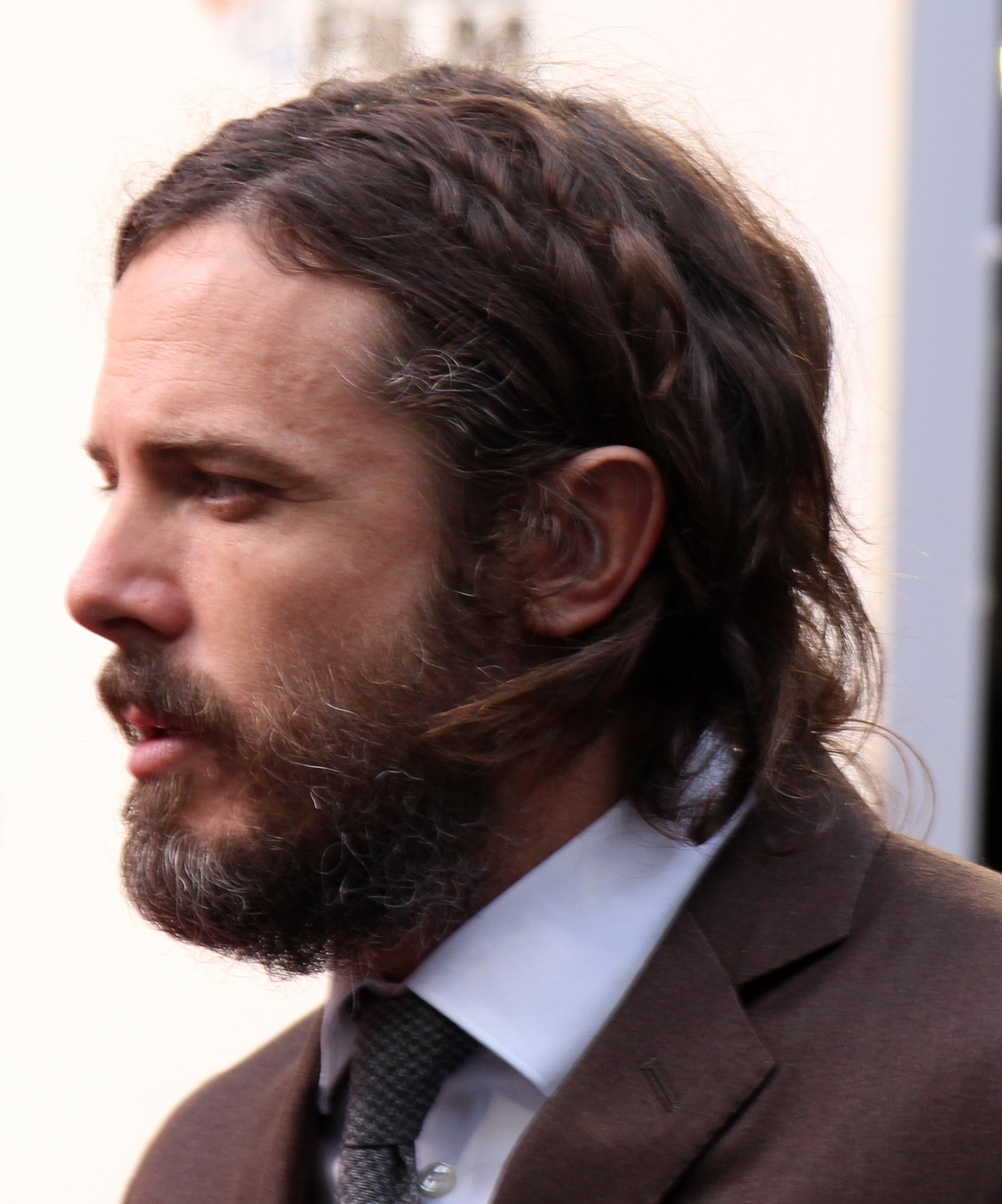
Affleck at the premiere of Manchester by the Sea in 2016

In his final role of 2016, Affleck starred as Lee Chandler, a grief-stricken loner, in Kenneth Lonergan's drama Manchester by the Sea. One of the film's producers, Matt Damon, initially intended to star in the film. When scheduling conflicts made this unfeasible, Damon agreed to step aside on the condition that he be replaced with Affleck. Lonergan readily agreed, remarking that Affleck was "the natural person to go to." Affleck had close relationships with both men and had previously offered notes on early drafts of the script. The film was a box office success, and Affleck's performance received widespread critical praise. A.O. Scott of The New York Times described it as "one of the most fiercely disciplined screen performances in recent memory. [He] conveys both Lee's inner avalanche of feeling and the numb decorum that holds it back."

Kenneth Turan of the Los Angeles Times praised his "quietly ferocious performance, his willingness to submerge himself into this character to an almost frightening extent." Ann Hornaday of The Washington Post said the film was "anchored by a quietly volcanic central performance by Casey Affleck, in a breathtaking breakout role he's long deserved." David Fear of Rolling Stone stated: "He's given impressive turns before [but] the way Affleck gradually shows you the man's bone-deep grief and emotional damage makes you believe that one of this generation's finest actors has simply been waiting to be coaxed out." Affleck won the National Board of Review, Critics' Choice, Golden Globe, BAFTA, and Academy Award for his performance.

After dropping out of Lowery's Pete's Dragon in order to star in Manchester by the Sea, Affleck reteamed with the director to star opposite Rooney Mara in the experimental drama A Ghost Story, which premiered at the Sundance Film Festival in early 2017. Affleck's character dies suddenly at the outset and he spends much of the film covered by a white sheet with two eye-holes, haunting his former home. David Rooney of The Hollywood Reporter said Affleck's performance managed to resonate despite limited time onscreen. Peter Debruge of Variety said Affleck "has never been an easy actor to read. He's a low-charisma mumbler who tends to keep his characters' emotions bottled up, making him the rare performer who can convey as much with a sheet over his head as he does without." Jordan Hoffman of The Guardian described him as "cinema's finest mumbler ... I can't even tell if he's speaking or just emitting high-pitched vibrations anymore." In 2018, Affleck starred opposite Robert Redford in the outlaw drama The Old Man & the Gun, his third collaboration with Lowery.

In 2019, he directed, wrote and starred in the survival drama Light of My Life. It had its world premiere at the Berlin International Film Festival on February 8, 2019 and received positive reviews from film critics. Affleck next starred in Our Friend, opposite Dakota Johnson and Jason Segel, directed by Gabriela Cowperthwaite, based upon a true story revolving around a couple, whose best friend moves in for support, following a cancer diagnosis. which had its world premiere at the 2019 Toronto International Film Festival. Affleck next acted in and produced The World to Come, directed by Mona Fastvold alongside Katherine Waterston and Vanessa Kirby. In 2023, Affleck played the supporting role of military intelligence officer Boris Pash in Christopher Nolan's biopic Oppenheimer. He also co-wrote and directed the movie Company in 2026, which opened at the 83rd Venice Film Festival on September 8, 2026 and stars Nick Nolte and Ben Mendelsohn. The film received mixed reviews.

== Personal life ==
=== Relationships and family ===
Affleck was introduced to actress Summer Phoenix by her brother, Joaquin, in the late 1990s. They began dating in 2000, and acted together in both the 2000 film Committed and a 2002 stage production of This Is Our Youth. The couple became engaged in January 2004 and married on June 3, 2006, in Savannah, Georgia. They have two sons born in 2004 and 2007. On August 1, 2017, Phoenix officially filed for divorce, citing "irreconcilable differences", and it was finalized three days later. Affleck has said it was an amicable divorce and that they remain friends.

He has been in a relationship with actress Caylee Cowan since January 2021.

=== Political views ===
In 2008, Affleck filmed an episode of documentary series 4Real, in which he visited the Pawnee Nation of Oklahoma, and remarked upon the progress they had made due largely to "their own resourcefulness and determination and their character, and not because of the goodness of our collective heart." During the 2016 presidential campaign, Affleck supported Hillary Clinton and characterized Donald Trump as "a dangerous fool". In 2017, multiple financial contributions to Trump were made by Affleck's production company, which he co-founded with John Powers Middleton. In a statement, Affleck denied involvement: "I had no knowledge of it, was never asked, and never would have authorized it ... The policies of the Trump administration, and the values they represent, are antithetical to everything I believe in."

=== Sexual harassment allegations ===
Affleck has settled two sexual harassment lawsuits out of court for an undisclosed amount.

In 2010, two of his former co-workers from I'm Still Here filed civil lawsuits against Affleck. Amanda White, one of the film's producers, sued Affleck for $2 million with multiple complaints including sexual harassment and breach of oral contract. She detailed numerous "uninvited and unwelcome sexual advances" in the workplace. White alleged that Affleck refused to honor the terms of the production agreement, including her fee, in retaliation.

The film's cinematographer, Magdalena Górka, sued Affleck for $2.25 million with multiple complaints including intentional infliction of emotional distress and breach of oral contract. Gorka alleged that she had been subjected to "routine instances" of sexual harassment by crew members including Antony Langdon, "within the presence and with the active encouragement of Affleck."

Initially, Affleck denied the allegations and threatened to countersue. No countersuits were filed. His lawyer claimed, "Both women left the film in April 2009 and both were refused when they wanted to return", and "there was no mention of sexual harassment before June [2010]." The film's associate producer Nicole Acacio and an unnamed female editor both defended Affleck's conduct on set. The lawsuits were later settled out of court. Both women received credit for their work on the project; no details of any financial settlement were released.

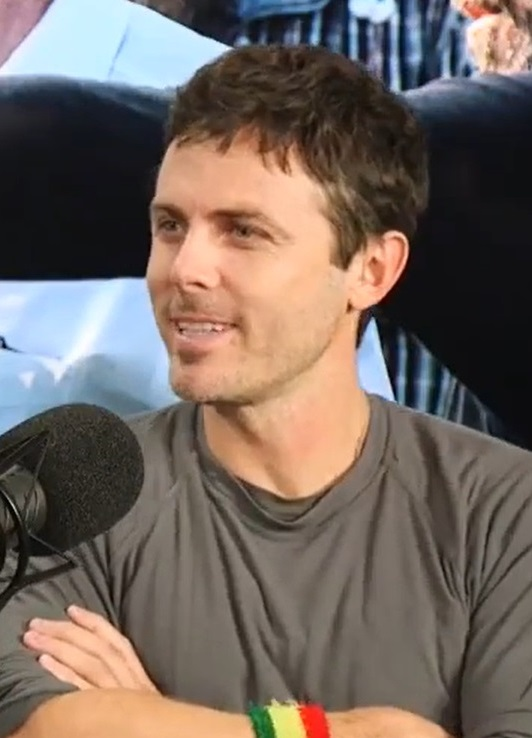
Casey Affleck in 2018

Affleck addressed the allegations in a 2016 interview with The New York Times, stating: "It was settled to the satisfaction of all. I was hurt and upset — I am sure all were — but I am over it. It was an unfortunate situation — mostly for the innocent bystanders of the families of those involved." The allegations and lawsuits attracted scrutiny during the 2016–17 film awards season, when Affleck was recognized for his performance in Manchester by the Sea, which culminated in further controversy following his Best Actor win at the 89th Academy Awards. The following year, amidst the MeToo movement, Affleck withdrew from presenting the award for Best Actress at the 90th Academy Awards.

In a 2018 interview with the Associated Press, Affleck discussed the lawsuits and allegations in light of the MeToo movement. He characterized his behavior at the time of the lawsuits as defensive and said he has since worked to understand his own culpability. He remorsefully acknowledged that the set of I'm Still Here was "an unprofessional environment" and that "I contributed to that unprofessional environment and I tolerated that kind of behavior from other people and I wish that I hadn't. And I regret a lot of that ... I behaved in a way and allowed others to behave in a way that was really unprofessional. And I'm sorry."

== Philanthropy ==
Affleck has been a vegan since 1995. He has been involved with animal rights campaigns for both People for the Ethical Treatment of Animals (PETA) and Farm Sanctuary.

In 2017, Affleck supported the 37th Annual National Veterans Wheelchair Games hosted by Paralyzed Veterans of America. In January 2019, he attended the fourth annual Veterans Awards as a presenter.

In June 2020, Affleck, with his mother Christopher, founded a fundraising effort, Stories from Tomorrow. The initiative was co-sponsored by Room to Read, WriteGirl and New Earth, an organization where Affleck is a board member. 'Stories from Tomorrow' matches original writing by children ages 5–18 with celebrities who read their work, which is then presented in video form. The money raised will be used to ensure that children around the world have access to education and food.

== Filmography ==
=== Film ===
Year	Title	Role	Notes
1995	To Die For	Russell Hines	
1996	Race the Sun	Daniel Webster	
1997	Floating	Prep #1	
1997	Chasing Amy	Little Kid	
1997	Good Will Hunting	Morgan O'Mally	
1998	Desert Blue	Pete Kepler	
1999	200 Cigarettes	Tom	
1999	American Pie	Tom Myers	Uncredited
2000	Drowning Mona	Bobby Calzone	
2000	Committed	Jay	
2000	Hamlet	Fortinbras	
2000	Attention Shoppers	Jed	
2001	Ocean's Eleven	Virgil Malloy	
2001	American Pie 2	Tom Myers	
2001	Soul Survivors	Sean	
2002	Gerry	Gerry	Also writer and editor
2004	Ocean's Twelve	Virgil Malloy	
2005	Lonesome Jim	Jim	
2006	The Last Kiss	Chris	
2007	Ocean's Thirteen	Virgil Malloy	
2007	The Assassination of Jesse James by the Coward Robert Ford	Robert Ford	
2007	Gone Baby Gone	Patrick Kenzie	
2010	The Killer Inside Me	Lou Ford	
2010	I'm Still Here	Himself	Also writer, producer, director, cinematographer, and editor
2011	Tower Heist	Charlie Gibbs	
2012	ParaNorman	Mitch Downe	Voice
2013	Ain't Them Bodies Saints	Bob Muldoon	
2013	Out of the Furnace	Rodney Baze Jr.	
2014	Interstellar	Tom Cooper (adult)	
2015	Unity	Narrator	Voice; documentary
2016	Manchester by the Sea	Lee Chandler	
2016	The Finest Hours	Ray Sybert	
2016	Triple 9	Chris Allen	
2017	A Ghost Story	C	
2018	The Old Man & the Gun	John Hunt	
2019	Light of My Life	Dad	Also director, writer, and producer
2019	Our Friend	Matthew Teague	
2020	The World to Come	Dyer	Also producer
2021	Every Breath You Take	Phillip	Also executive producer
2022	Dreamin' Wild	Donnie Emerson	
2023	Oppenheimer	Boris Pash	
2024	The Instigators	Cobby	Also writer
2024	Slingshot	John	
2026	Company	—N/a	Director, writer, producer, editor, and cinematographer
TBA	Bitcoin	Craig Steven Wright	Post-production

=== Television ===
Year	Title	Role	Notes
1988	American Playhouse	Jerry	Television film; episode: "Lemon Sky"
1990	The Kennedys of Massachusetts	Young Robert Kennedy	Miniseries
2010	WWII in HD: The Air War	Joe Armanini	Voice; television film
2016	Saturday Night Live	Himself	Host; episode: "Casey Affleck/Chance the Rapper"

=== Music video ===
Year	Title	Role	Artist	Notes
2024	"Oak Island"	Himself	Zach Bryan	Song from album The Great American Bar Scene

== See also ==
- List of actors with Academy Award nominations
