= Caylee Cowan =

American actress (born 1998)

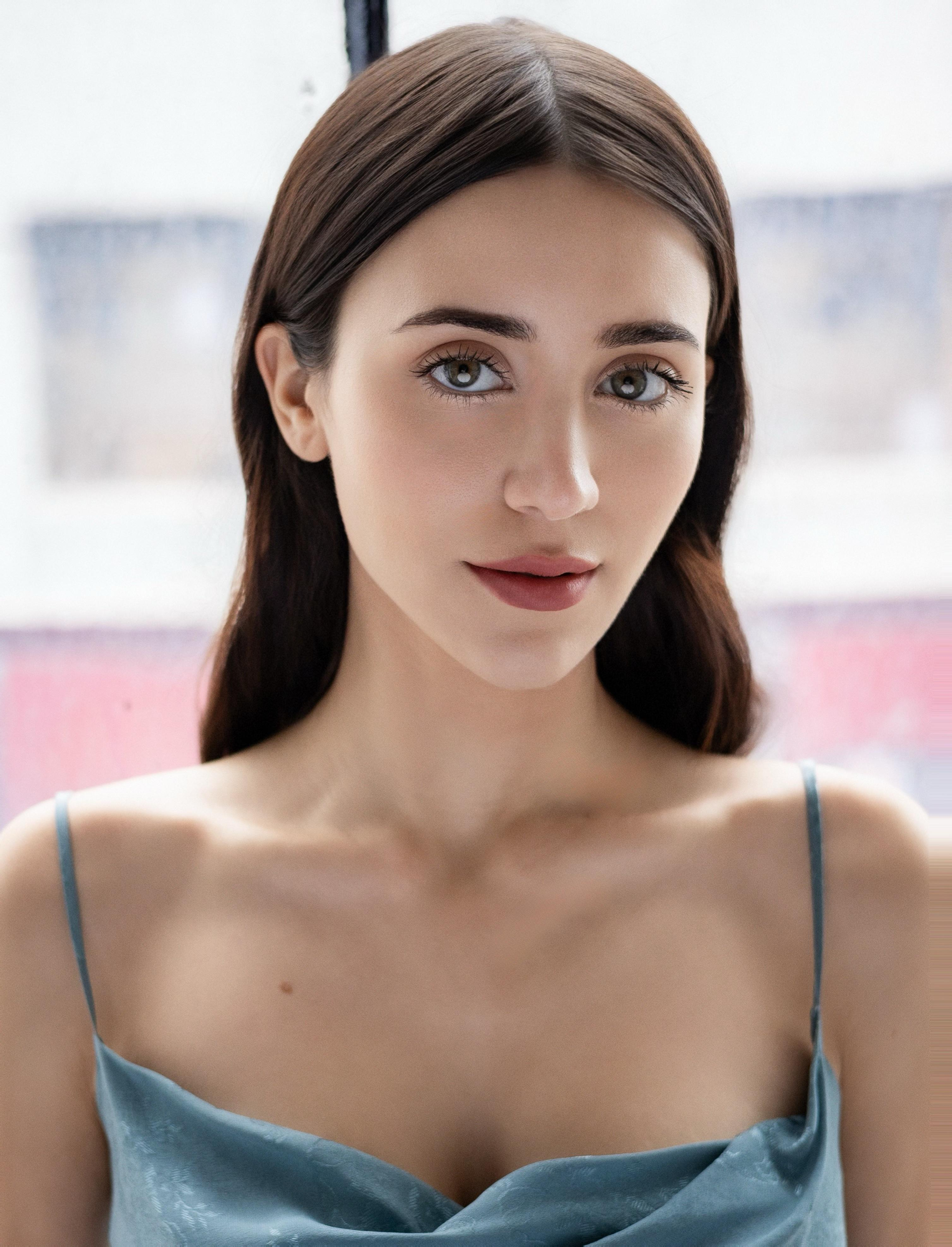
- Cowan in 2025
- Born: Catherine Caylee Cowan; March 19, 1998 (age 28); Los Angeles, California, U.S.
- Occupation: Actress
- Years active: 2017–present
- Partner: Casey Affleck (2021–present)

Catherine Caylee Cowan (born March 19, 1998) is an American actress. She is best known for her roles in Sunrise in Heaven (2019), Willy's Wonderland (2021), Spinning Gold (2022), and Frank and Penelope (2022).

== Early life ==
Cowan was born in Los Angeles, California. She was raised by a single mother and is the youngest of three children. After graduating from high school, Cowan began acting in theater productions. She appeared in productions of Three Sisters by Anton Chekhov, The Glass Menagerie by Tennessee Williams, and Danny and the Deep Blue Sea by John Patrick Shanley.

== Career ==
Cowan made her film debut playing the character of Jan in the American romance 1950s period drama Sunrise in Heaven, in an adaptation of Jan Gilbert Hurst's book His Sunrise My Sunset. The movie was released on Netflix on April 1, 2020.

In 2021, Cowan went on to appear in the indie horror thriller Incision (film), as Becca Landry. That same year, Cowan played a supporting role of Kathy Barnes in the action comedy horror Willy's Wonderland acting alongside Nicolas Cage in an ensemble of teen actors.

In 2022, Cowan was cast in a lead role in the independent romantic thriller Frank and Penelope, as Penelope, "a doe-eyed femme fatale". The film, which also includes Kevin Dillon, Lin Shaye, and Johnathon Schaech in the cast, was the directorial debut of actor Sean Patrick Flannery. Cowan and the cast attended the world premiere of the movie at the Riviera International Film Festival, and the screening at the Cannes Film Festival.

In 2023, Cowan appeared in a supporting role as Farrah Lee in the biographical musical drama, Spinning Gold, and in a supporting role as Felicity in the science fiction thriller, Divinity, directed by Eddie Alcazar and produced by Steven Soderbergh which premiered on opening night at Screamfest Horror Film Festival and was in competition at Sundance Film Festival. She is a co-executive producer on Robert Rodriguez's action-thriller, Hypnotic, which screened at the South by Southwest film festival.

Cowan was cast as Christina Christmas in the movie Holiday Twist, directed by Stephanie Garvin, which was released in December 2023.

In August 2024, she was cast as Casey Spencer in Mother and Me.

== Personal life ==
Cowan has been dating actor Casey Affleck since January 2021.

== Filmography ==
=== Film ===
| Year | Title | Role | Notes |
|---|---|---|---|
| 2018 | ToBox | Elle | Short film; Advert |
| 2018 | Pleasures of a Modern Woman | Pin-up Girl | Short film |
| 2018 | Easter Egg | C3AI | |
| 2019 | Home | Mary | Short film |
| 2019 | Sunrise in Heaven | Jan Hurst | AKA: Modern Love |
| 2020 | Incision | Becca Landry | |
| 2021 | Willy's Wonderland | Kathy Barnes | |
| 2021 | Year of the Detectives | Holly Martins | AKA: Bad Detectives |
| 2021 | Between Towns | Cassidy Cunningham | AKA: Prom Night |
| 2022 | Geo | Gemma | Short film |
| 2022 | Frank and Penelope | Penelope | |
| 2023 | Running to Stand Still | Hope | Short film; Director/writer/producer |
| 2023 | Chopper | Chloe Winwood | Short films |
| 2023 | The Gateway Drug | Billie | Short films |
| 2023 | Divinity | Felicity | |
| 2023 | Spinning Gold | Farrah Lee | |
| 2023 | Holiday Twist | Christina Christmas | |
| 2024 | The Spider | Gwen Stacy | Short film |
| 2024 | Double Exposure | Sara | |
| 2024 | The Beast Within | Willow | AKA: What Remains of Us |
| 2024 | The Instigators | Mayor's Assistant | |
| 2025 | Sweating the Small Stuff | Via | Short film |
| 2025 | Hollywood Grit | Vivan Blake | |
| 2026 | 4 Kids Walk Into a Bank | Jenny | |
| TBA | Mother and Me | Casey Spencer | |
| TBA | Stay at Home | Sydney | |
| TBA | The Possession at Gladstone Manor | Jamie Black | Executive producer |
| TBA | Fade to Black | Vanessa | |
| TBA | The First Day of Spring | TBA | |

=== Television ===
| Year | Title | Role | Notes |
|---|---|---|---|
| 2017 | The Tactical Combat Simulator | Fighter | Episode: "Third Round: Third Fight" |
| 2019 | Life in LA | Kelly | Episode: "It's Not Your Fault" |
| 2019 | Lethal Weapon | Waitress | Episode: "The Spy Who Loved Me" |
| 2020 | Buried in the Backyard | Jessica Thomas | Episode: "Girl in the Grave" |
| 2023 | Stay Out | Christie Ann | Television film for BET |

=== Music videos ===
| Year | Title | Artist |
|---|---|---|
| 2021 | "Convenience" | Pretty Sister |
| 2022 | "Sundress" | Austin Mahone |
| 2022 | "Die in LA" | Hunter Daily |
