= The Never =

- Origin: Chapel Hill, North Carolina
- Genres: Pop rock
- Label: Trekky Records
- Members: Noah Smith; Joah Tunnell; Jonny Tunnell
- Past members: Ari Picker
- Website: Official Site

The Never is a Chapel Hill-based indie band. They have released two albums, both of which include both folk metal and R&B sensibilities. They have toured throughout the South and the East Coast of the U.S. and have performed with both Rilo Kiley and R.E.M. Many of the songs on their latest album, Antarctica, deal with environmental issues, a band trait accentuated by their use of tour vehicles that are fueled by vegetable oil and biodiesel.

== Early years ==
The Never began as a high school project-turned-successful-band called The B-Sides, composed of founding members Noah Smith and Ari Picker, as well as keyboardist Travis Horton, drummer Eric Kuhn, and bassist Ken Mosher, formerly of the Squirrel Nut Zippers. Their full-length album Yes, Indeed, the B-Sides, Quite! was self-released in 2001 and became North Carolina's best-selling independent release for that year. When line-up changes left Smith and Picker as the only remaining original members, and with the addition of the brothers Jonny and Joah Tunnel of Vibrant Green, the band's name was changed to The Never.

== Debut album ==
After The Never signed to MoRisen Records in 2003, they released their self-titled debut in 2004. The album was produced and engineered by John Plymale at Overdub Lane, in Durham, North Carolina. Over 4,000 copies were sold nationwide.

== Antarctica ==
The Never's 2006 second album represented a major change in the band's identity. Founding member Ari Picker left the band to enroll in Berklee College of Music, and has never been permanently replaced. The band also signed to Trekky Records to record and release the album, which became a very encouraging partnership for them in undertaking the massive multi-media project.

Antarctica is literally a storybook record, one-half full-length album and one-half fully illustrated children's book by Noah Smith, inspired by similar records from members' childhoods. It features 40 oil paintings by Smith, as well as numerous contributions from other Trekky Records musicians in almost every song. Both the story's narrative and many of the songs deal with environmental issues along with the theme of "a plea for everyone young and old to remember the simple things of childhood" and "to appreciate the world and all the beauty it has to offer."

== Live performances ==
While The Never have occasionally put on large-scale, full ensemble performances to re-create the "size" of many of the Antarctica songs, most of the band's live performances involve greatly scaling down the songs to only three instruments, creating a roughly 'stripped-down' sound and forcing the band to make creative alterations that are generally met with enthusiasm and praise by audiences. Because all three band members sing prominently, one of the most significant parts of their performance is their harmony and sharing of vocal duties, which appears consistently on record and on stage. Drummer Jonny Tunnell often enjoys dancing the flamenco in the middle of performances with randomly selected men in the audience, though these pursuits have recently been put on hold due to a sprained ankle.

== Discography ==
Albums

- The Never (MoRisen, 2004)
- Antarctica (Trekky Records, 2006)

== Band lineup ==
=== Current members ===
- Noah Smith — vocals, guitar, bass
- Joah Tunnell — vocals, bass, guitar
- Jonny Tunnell — vocals, drums, flute

=== Former members ===
- Ari Picker — vocals, guitar, keyboards

Ari has since formed the band Lost in the Trees, a band now signed to ANTI-Records.

=== Guest members ===
- Jones Smith
- Bobby Britt
- Will Hackney
- David Feldman

== See also ==
- Trekky Records
