= Long face =

Long face may refer to:

- Long face syndrome, also referred to as "skeletal open bite," a dentofacial abnormality characterized by excessive vertical facial development
- Little Hawk (1836–1900), an Oglala Lakota war chief who once took the name Long Face
- "Long Face", a 2026 song by The Vampire Lestat from the television series Interview with the Vampire

== See also ==
- Why the Long Face (disambiguation)
