= Butterscotch Bitch =

2026 single by The Vampire Lestat

Single by The Vampire Lestat
- Released: May 15, 2026
- Genre: Glam rock
- Length: 4:09
- Label: Lakeshore Records
- Songwriter: Daniel Hart
- Producers: Daniel Hart; Danny Reisch

The Vampire Lestat singles chronology
"Dancing with Myself" (2026)	"Butterscotch Bitch" (2026)	"Your Biggest Fan" (2026)

"Butterscotch Bitch" is a glam rock song by fictional character The Vampire Lestat, performed by Australian actor Sam Reid and written by American composer Daniel Hart for the third season of AMC's gothic horror series Interview with the Vampire, retitled The Vampire Lestat after Anne Rice's 1985 novel of same name and its lead character, a vampire rock star. It was released as The Vampire Lestat's fourth official single on May 15, 2026.

== Background ==
The music and lyrics for "Butterscotch Bitch" were written by American composer Daniel Hart, who also produced the song along with Danny Reisch for the third season of AMC's gothic horror series Interview with the Vampire, retitled The Vampire Lestat after Anne Rice's 1985 novel of same name and its lead character, a vampire rock star. The song was performed by Australian actor Sam Reid, who portrays Lestat in the series.

In a press release, Hart said of the song:

'Butterscotch Bitch' is, I hope, the song that feels the most like Lestat, as it's the song I wrote with the most knowledge of Lestat under my belt to date'. And why not end the songwriting with a song that Lestat wrote about himself? He is, after all, The Lestat-iest Lestat that’s ever Lestat-ed.

The Vampire Lestat said of the song:

'Butterscotch Bitch' is, I hope, the song that feels the most like Daniel Hart, as it's the song he wrote on a toilet in between vegan burritos and sessions for his Mother Mary score. May it find a home on Anne Hathaway's rescue dog grooming playlist.

== Release ==
"Butterscotch Bitch" was featured on a teaser trailer for The Vampire Lestat released by Collider on May 14, 2026. It was officially released as The Vampire Lestat's fifth single by AMC Networks and Lakeshore Records on streaming services on May 15, 2026, ahead of the series' third season premiere on June 7, 2026.

On June 2, 2026, Reid performed "Butterscotch Bitch" live for the first time during a one-night-only concert in which he performed in character as The Vampire Lestat at the Beacon Theatre in New York City.

== Reception ==
Rotem Rusak of Nerdist called "Butterscotch Bitch" "a true bop", adding that it was The Vampire Lestat's "best song yet".

Alex V. of Q+ Magazine said of the song: "There's humor here, even when it's bleak. He [Lestat]'s theatrical to the point of self-parody, then suddenly devastating in the next breath. That swing between diva energy and emotional collapse is exactly what makes the track feel so aligned with who Lestat has been presenting himself as: a spectacle to be witnessed. A star who cannot decide if he wants to be worshipped, pitied, or feared... so he insists on all three. In that sense, Butterscotch Bitch doesn't just continue his musical arc, but cranks it up. This is Lestat fully leaning into the idea that pain, ego, desire, and spectacle are all part of the same show. And he's very much running it. It also fits neatly into the larger rollout of this era, which continues to blur the line between myth-making and media satire."

== Personnel ==
Credits adapted from Tidal.

- Sam Reid (as The Vampire Lestat) (Note: Sam Reid was credited as "The Vampire Lestat" on streaming platforms.) – lead vocals
- Daniel Hart – producer
- Danny Reisch – producer, recording engineer, mixer
- Howie Weinberg – mastering engineer
- Will Borza – mastering engineer
