= All Fall Down (The Vampire Lestat song) =

2026 single by The Vampire Lestat

Single by The Vampire Lestat

from the EP Detroit
- Released: March 13, 2026
- Genre: Glam rock
- Length: 1:08
- Label: Lakeshore Records
- Songwriter: Daniel Hart
- Producers: Daniel Hart; Danny Reisch

The Vampire Lestat singles chronology
"Long Face" (2026)	"All Fall Down" (2026)	"Dancing with Myself" (2026)

"All Fall Down" is a glam rock song by fictional character The Vampire Lestat, performed by Australian actor Sam Reid and written by American composer Daniel Hart as the main theme song for the third season of AMC's gothic horror series Interview with the Vampire, retitled The Vampire Lestat after Anne Rice's 1985 novel of the same name and its lead character, a vampire rock star. It was released as The Vampire Lestat's second official single on March 13, 2026, before making its debut on the episode "Detroit" that aired on June 7, 2026. It was featured on the EP Detroit that was released on June 9, 2026.

== Background ==
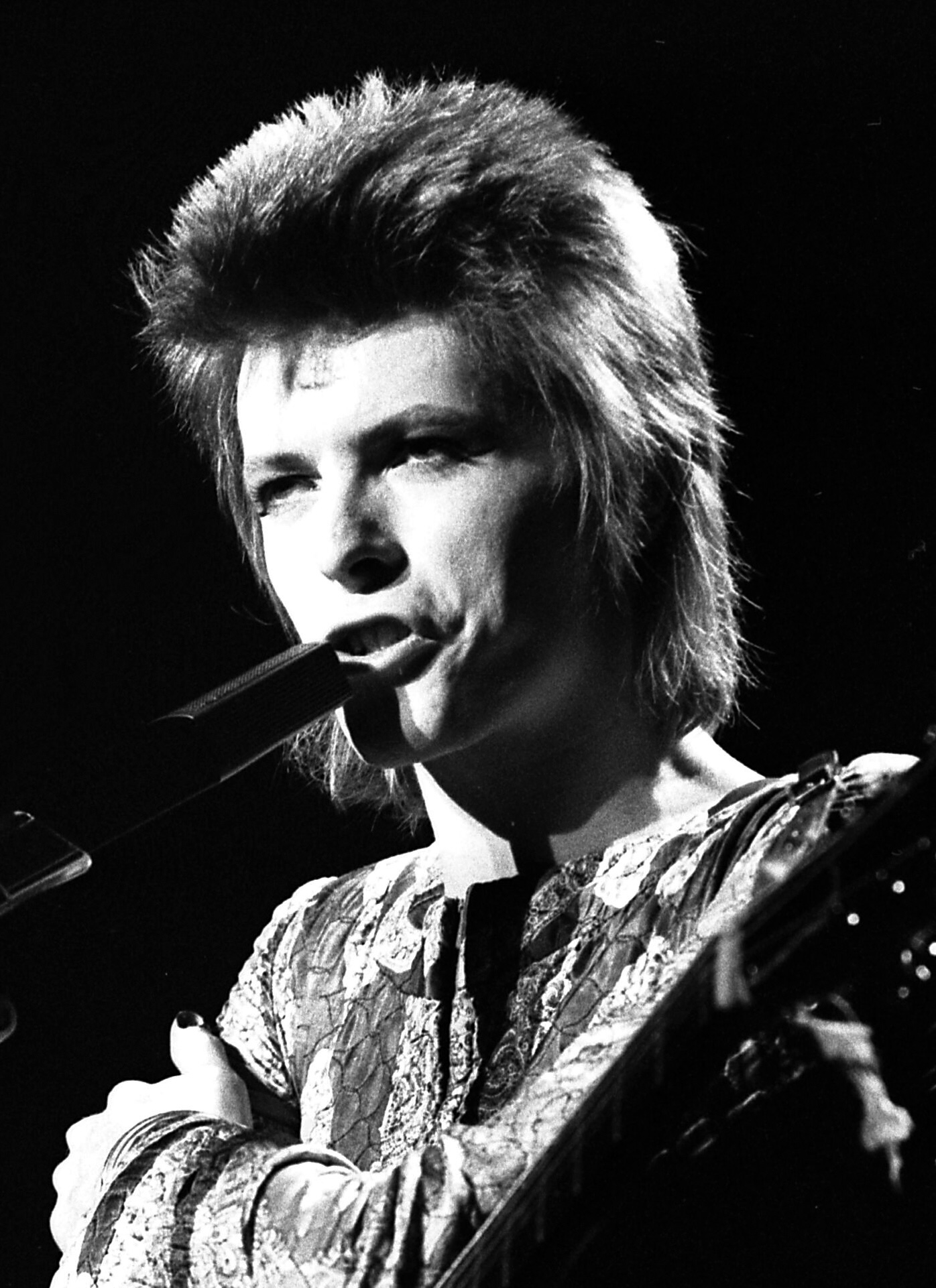
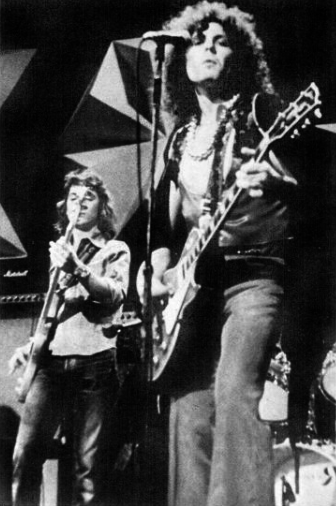
David Bowie (top) and T. Rex (bottom) were the main influences for "All Fall Down".

The music and lyrics for "All Fall Down" were written by American composer Daniel Hart, who also produced the song along with Danny Reisch for the third season of AMC's gothic horror series Interview with the Vampire, retitled The Vampire Lestat after Anne Rice's 1985 novel of same name and its lead character, a vampire rock star.

Hart said of the song:

"All Fall Down" is both the title track for the new season and the idea for a song by the Vampire Lestat from early in the band's life. Much like "Long Face", it feels heavily influenced by Bowie, T. Rex, and other 70s rock'n'roll stars who were looking back to the blues as much as they were looking up to the stars for inspiration. ‘All Fall Down’ marks a time in this vampire band's life when they were still figuring out exactly what their sound was, and before Lestat himself started to change personas and explore other musical styles. At the same time, with "All Fall Down", we tried to capture the overall feeling of this new Lestat we get to know better and better throughout the season: more wild, more raw, more self-deprecatingly funny than ever before.

The Vampire Lestat said of the song:

"All Fall Down" is mercifully only 68 seconds long. That's 54 seconds more Daniel Hart than anyone should suffer. I like the harmonies on the chorus. I did those.

== Main theme for The Vampire Lestat ==
On June 7, 2026, "All Fall Down" debuted as the main theme song for the third season of Interview with the Vampire, now titled The Vampire Lestat, whose opening title sequence was designed by Patrick Clair and his team at Antibody. In an interview with Stash in April 2026, Clair explained the opening title sequence:

For the third season, the show evolves to take on a new title and a new challenge: capturing the energy and zeitgeist of a Vampire rockstar. We looked at the way popular musicians are celebrated in the age of TikTok and social media: an endless cavalcade of remix videos, thirst posting and fan hype. We took images of Lestat and mixed with them Vampiric folklore across recent pop culture, adding hyperreal colors and obscure references to the show. I'm usually away from the tools but for this job I had the opportunity to go through the renders fame-by-frame scratching in graffiti, defacements and doodles. This project was about exploring how the fans of the story world see Lestat, played by Aussie actor Sam Reid, as an ambitious Rock God for a post-truth era. We had enormous fun crafting this sequence, for a show I truly love. Lestat is a narcissistic creative force devoted to violence, passion – and above all – intense bloody reverie. I hope our tribute does him justice. Deepest thanks to collaborator and showrunner Rolin Jones and the team, this one was a true labor of love.

== Release ==
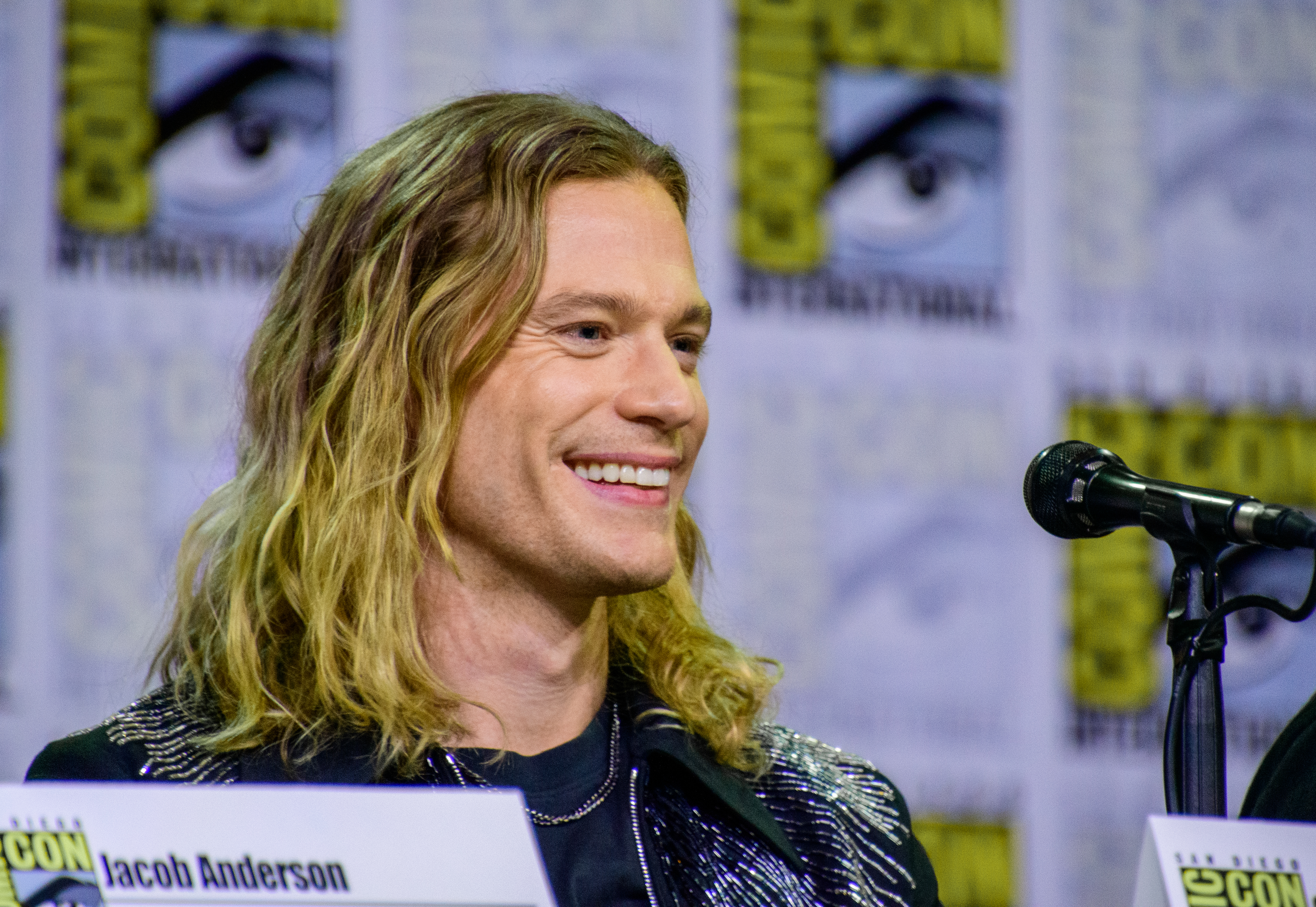
Sam Reid performed "All Fall Down" as The Vampire Lestat.

The song was featured on the teaser trailer for the third season of Interview with the Vampire that was released during the New York Comic Con on October 10, 2025.

"All Fall Down" was officially released as The Vampire Lestat's second single by AMC Networks and Lakeshore Records on streaming services on March 13, 2026, ahead of the third season's premiere on June 7, 2026. A lyric video and a video of the full opening title sequence were released on the same day. The song was featured on the EP Detroit that was released on June 9, 2026.

=== Release history ===
Release dates and formats for "All Fall Down"
Region	Date	Format(s)	Label(s)	Ref.
Various	February 13, 2026	Digital download; streaming	Lakeshore Records; AMC Networks	
Various	June 7, 2026	TV premiere	Lakeshore Records; AMC Networks	

== Personnel ==
Credits adapted from Tidal.

- Sam Reid (as The Vampire Lestat) (Note: Sam Reid was credited as "The Vampire Lestat" on streaming platforms.) – lead vocals
- Daniel Hart – producer
- Danny Reisch – producer, recording engineer, mixer
- Howie Weinberg – mastering engineer
- Will Borza – mastering engineer
