= Your Biggest Fan =

Your Biggest Fan may refer to:

- Your Biggest Fan (EP), 2006 EP by Voxtrot
- Your Biggest Fan (song)
