= Your Biggest Fan (song) =

2026 single by The Vampire Lestat

Single by The Vampire Lestat
- Released: May 29, 2026
- Genre: Rock ballad
- Length: 4:27
- Label: Lakeshore Records
- Songwriter: Daniel Hart
- Producers: Daniel Hart; Danny Reisch; Christoph Andersson; John Michael Rouchell

The Vampire Lestat singles chronology
"Butterscotch Bitch" (2026)	"Your Biggest Fan" (2026)

"Your Biggest Fan" is a song by fictional character The Vampire Lestat, performed by Australian actor Sam Reid and written by American composer Daniel Hart for the third season of AMC's gothic horror series Interview with the Vampire, retitled The Vampire Lestat after Anne Rice's 1985 novel of same name and its lead character, a vampire rock star. It was released as The Vampire Lestat's fifth official single on May 29, 2026. The song tells the story of Lestat's transformation into a vampire from the point of view of his maker, Magnus, who was obsessed with Lestat and turned him into a vampire against his will.

== Background ==
The music and lyrics for the rock ballad "Your Biggest Fan" were written by American composer Daniel Hart, who also produced the song along with Danny Reisch, Christoph Andersson and John Michael Rouchell for the third season of AMC's gothic horror series Interview with the Vampire, retitled The Vampire Lestat after Anne Rice's 1985 novel of same name and its lead character, a vampire rock star. The song was performed by Australian actor Sam Reid, who portrays Lestat in the series.

The lyrics talk about ancient vampire Magnus' obsession with Lestat before turning him into a vampire against his will. The line "I'm a dog and you're my brave little wolfkiller" was based on the quote "'Brave strong little Wolfkiller,' it said to me now in a rounder, deeper voice," from the novel The Vampire Lestat, when Lestat recalls being stalked and kidnapped by Magnus, who called him "Wolfkiller" after he killed eight wolves in his village in Auvergne, France, when he was still human.

The song was written early in the series' writers' room process, with Hart going back and forth between the writer's room table and a little musical studio he had set up in the same house. Ideas developed collaboratively between Hart and the screenwriters, with narrative discussions about the season's plot and characters informing the song's direction. In developing the track, Hart drew on Lestat's transformation in the book, as well as the writers' interest in exploring new perspectives. The song was conceived as a reinterpretation of Lestat transformation into a vampire, differing from both the novel and the series' previous two seasons. Hart and the screenwriters also wanted to show something different than they had already seen in other television shows. Hart ultimately chose to present the song from the perspective of Magnus, reframing Lestat's transformation as a distorted expression of affection rather than violence. Hart explained the song in an interview with Nerdist in June 2026:

So I don't know why it occurred to me, probably because deep down I am very dark and twisted, but I thought, well, if he's going to write a song about his transformation, then he should write it from the point of view of the person who transformed him. And since it was basically abduction and then abuse, and a rape of sorts, then that would be Lestat's experience of it.

But the person who did those things, as can often be the case in real life, the person who is the tormentor, the predator, the abuser, doesn't view themselves that way. And for Magnus, I don't think he viewed himself that way at all, and either because he himself was so dark and twisted or because by that point in his own life, he had just basically lost his mind. So I thought, yeah, he wouldn't think of himself as doing something terrible at all. He wasn't torturing people. He was loving them. So I thought, oh, it’s a love song. Obviously, it's a love song. So then I started writing a love song about abducting someone and then torturing them, and then it became the thing that it is.

But, [of course, the song] is really about Lestat's version of what he thinks Magnus thought was happening. Since he barely knew him. The guy transformed him and then threw himself into a fire, and that was that.

== Release ==
"Your Biggest Fan" was officially released as The Vampire Lestat's fifth single by AMC Networks and Lakeshore Records on streaming services on May 29, 2026, ahead of the series' third season premiere on June 7, 2026.

On June 2, 2026, Reid performed "Your Biggest Fan" live for the first time during a one-night-only concert in which he performed in character as The Vampire Lestat at the Beacon Theatre in New York City.

== Reception ==
Rotem Rusak of Nerdist wrote that "Your Biggest Fan" is "Lestat's most haunting song".

Alex V. of Q+ Magazine called it "the best song released from the Vampire Lestat so far", adding: "Sam Reid continues to be genuinely unbelievable as Lestat, and Your Biggest Fan gives him room to explore a completely different vocal texture than we've heard from the previous singles. There's still swagger here, still theatricality, but there's also something deeply sinister lurking beneath the performance that keeps the song feeling tense from beginning to end. Reid understands better than anyone that within Anne Rice's Immortal Universe, desire and horror are often inseparable things." Rusak also praised Hart: "And we truly need to talk about Daniel Hart's songwriting here because adapting this chapter of Lestat's life into music could not have been easy. The brilliance of Your Biggest Fan is that it never sanitizes the ugliness of Magnus' obsession, but it also never loses sight of why Lestat's trauma continues to define so much of who he becomes afterward."

== Personnel ==
Credits adapted from Tidal.

- Sam Reid (as The Vampire Lestat) (Note: Sam Reid was credited as "The Vampire Lestat" on streaming platforms.) – lead vocals
- Daniel Hart – producer
- Danny Reisch – producer, recording engineer, mixer
- Christoph Andersson – producer
- John Michael Rouchell – producer
- Howie Weinberg – mastering engineer
- Will Borza – mastering engineer
