= The Physics of Meaning =

- Origin: Chapel Hill, North Carolina
- Genres: Indie pop
- Years active: 2005–2008
- Labels: Bu Hanan Records, Trekky Records
- Past members: Daniel Hart; Alex Laraza; Dylan Thurston; Wil Wright; Wylie Pamplin; Wendy Spitzer; Claire Hollins
- Website: http://www.thephysicsofmeaning.com

The Physics of Meaning was an indie pop band from Chapel Hill, North Carolina. Its members included Daniel Hart and Alex Laraza, along with other live musicians and session members. They released two studio albums: the self-titled The Physics of Meaning on Bu Hanan Records in 2005, and Snake Charmer and Destiny at the Stroke of Midnight on Bu Hanan Records and Trekky Records in 2008. Hart is a classically trained violinist who lives in Dallas, Texas. He recorded and released an album under his own name in 2011 called The Orientalist. He was a member of the touring and recording bands of Other Lives, St. Vincent, John Vanderslice, The Polyphonic Spree, and The Rosebuds. Hart now fronts the Dallas-based band Dark Rooms, who released their self-titled LP in May 2013.

== The Physics of Meaning track listing ==
1. "Charles Wallace, Where Have You Gone?" – 3:18
2. "Small Towns and Invisible People" – 3:31
3. "Resurrection and Crucifixion" – 3:26
4. "Bigger Cities, Thicker Doors" – 5:18
5. "Manhattan Is an Island" – 4:26
6. "Crystal Ball Is Cracking" – 4:30
7. "The Inconceivable Nature of Vizzini" – 3:54
8. "Oregon, My Only True Friend" – 3:40
9. "Down at Columbia and Cameron" – 4:40
10. "The Fountain of Youth Dries Up in an Election Year" – 4:31
11. "A Slowly Tilting Planet" – 6:04
