= The Old Man & the Gun (soundtrack) =

The Old Man & the Gun (Original Motion Picture Soundtrack)

Soundtrack album by Daniel Hart
- Released: October 5, 2018
- Recorded: 2018
- Genre: Film score
- Length: 58:23
- Label: Varèse Sarabande
- Producer: Daniel Hart

Daniel Hart chronology
A Ghost Story (2017)	The Old Man & the Gun (2018)	Light of My Life (2019)

The Old Man & the Gun (Original Motion Picture Soundtrack) is the film score soundtrack to the 2018 film The Old Man & the Gun directed by David Lowery, starring Robert Redford, Casey Affleck, Danny Glover, Tika Sumpter, Tom Waits and Sissy Spacek. The film score is composed by Daniel Hart and released through Varèse Sarabande on October 5, 2018.

== Development ==
Daniel Hart renewed his association with David Lowery after previously working on Ain't Them Bodies Saints (2013), Pete's Dragon (2016) and A Ghost Story (2017). Like his previous films, Hart would watch the film without music, develop his ideas and create demos for possible themes with the specific instruments and record them; he would repeat the process again for finding suitable themes for particular sequences. He described the experience of scoring The Old Man & the Gun as the "most fun I've ever had scoring a film". He had the original idea for the kiss scene between Redford and Spacek and used it for the particular sequence which he enjoyed bringing it to life. The flashback car sequence was the toughest score, and he missed composing the first version. After writing the piece which suited the theme, he assembled several instruments, such as jazz piano, strings, saxophones and recorded them. The score accompanied jazz influences.

== Track listing ==
No.	Title	Artist(s)	Length
1.	"Theme"		1:46
2.	"The Diner Part One"		3:10
3.	"The Diner Part Two"		1:30
4.	"30 Century Man"	Scott Walker	1:26
5.	"Three Day Bank"		6:41
6.	"John and Maureen"		2:01
7.	"More Happy"		1:58
8.	"The Over the Hill Gang"		2:57
9.	"You're Doing a Great Job"		3:34
10.	"Freeze Sailor"		2:05
11.	"Two Different Things"		2:29
12.	"West St. Louis Toodle Oo"		1:08
13.	"He Must Be Thinking of You"		2:03
14.	"Keep on Pushin'"		3:47
15.	"Lola"	The Kinks	4:05
16.	"Jewels for Jewel"		2:16
17.	"When You Find Something You Love"		2:24
18.	"The Gun and The Kiss"		2:50
19.	"Blues Run the Game"	Jackson C. Frank	3:31
20.	"Officially Retired"		2:16
21.	"Rub A Dub Dub"		2:34
22.	"Samuel Anselm"		1:52
Total length:			58:23

== Reception ==
Dana Stevens of Slate called it a "warm, jazzy score". Tim Grierson of Screen International wrote "Daniel Hart's lyrical score adorns Tucker's restlessnes". Nev Pierce of Empire called the score "percussive" and "Lalo Schifrin-flavoured". Eric Kohn of IndieWire noted "Daniel Hart's jazzy, upbeat score keeps each scene flowing into the next". David Ehrlich called it as one of the best film scores of 2018, summarizing " just a few notes of Daniel Hart's rollicking score is all it takes to convey the film's charms, and the music will convince people to give it a watch long after the year-end madness has released us from its maw." Peter Debruge of Variety wrote "Daniel Hart's score sounds like it belongs in such a place, setting the tempo for a movie that dares to get existential". Clint Worthington of Consequence stated "frequent Lowery collaborator Daniel Hart does his best Marvin Hamlisch impersonation with Old Man's silky-smooth jazz scoring". Sandy Schaefer of Screen Rant called it as a "genially laid-back jazzy score".
