= Bill Mechanic =

American film producer (born 1950)

- Born: William M. Mechanic; May 12, 1950 (age 76); Detroit, Michigan, U.S.
- Occupation: Film producer

William M. Mechanic (born May 12, 1950) is an American film producer. He is the chairman and CEO of Pandemonium Films.

Mechanic serves on the board of counselors for USC School of Cinematic Arts, and the board of BFI Southbank (formerly known as the National Film Theatre) American Friends. He has also served on the board of governors of the Academy of Motion Picture Arts and Sciences. Mechanic has been honored with the Showman of the Year Award by the Producers Guild of America. He is in the Video Hall of Fame, and has received a Martini Shot Mentor award from Women in Film Crystal + Lucy Awards in 1999. Mechanic has served as an executive for Paramount Pictures and Warner Bros.

== Early life ==
Mechanic graduated from Michigan State University in 1973 with a degree in English.

== Career ==
From 1978 to 1982, Mechanic worked for Select TV Programming Inc., as vice president of programming. He also held the position of vice president of pay TV and post-theatrical markets for Paramount and senior creative executive at Paramount Pictures.

=== 1984–1994: At Disney ===
Following a position at Paramount Pictures, Mechanic moved to Disney in 1984, subsequently building its home-video units both in the United States and overseas from minor industry players to nearly double the size of their nearest competitors. The division grew from $30 million in revenue to over $3 billion and notched the majority of the all-time best-selling videos. Mechanic pioneered the concept of direct sales to mass merchants, which has become an important part of the home entertainment business today.

At the Walt Disney Studios, where he served as president of international distribution and worldwide video, he oversaw international theatrical, worldwide home video, and worldwide pay television.

Mechanic is married to Carol Mechanic. They have a daughter named Erin Mechanic.

One of Mechanic's critical moves occurred when he ended a five-year relationship between Disney and Warner Bros. for the overseas distribution of the Disney studio's theatrical product and set up Buena Vista International (BVI). In its first full year of operation, the unit became the industry's No. 1 Distributor. It was the first completely new international theatrical distribution organization in more than three decades.

Mechanic had also served as both senior vice president of Walt Disney Home Video and vice president of pay television sales for the Walt Disney Company. During this period, he also oversaw network specials for Disney Television that received several Emmy Awards nominations.

=== 1994–2000: At Fox Entertainment ===
In 1994, he became the chairman and chief executive officer of Fox Filmed Entertainment., which is a corporate division of News Corporation. In his new position, Mechanic was responsible not only for Fox's home video activities, but for production, marketing, distribution, international theatrical activities, and pay TV as well.

Fox produced the number-one grossing films worldwide in 1995, 1996 and 1997 with Die Hard with a Vengeance, Independence Day and Titanic.

As a result of his leadership, in 1998, Twentieth Century Fox was the number-one studio in worldwide box-office gross revenue. That same year, Fox Music produced five of the top ten selling soundtracks: Titanic, Hope Floats, Dr. Dolittle, Bulworth, and Ally McBeal. In addition, during his reign, the studio produced six of the top ten grossing movies of all time and six of the top ten selling live-action videos-both domestically and internationally, including the best-selling video in history, Titanic.

Under his management, in all, the studio earned 72 Oscar nominations, including five Best Picture nominations.

In June 2000, it was reported that Bill Mechanic was leaving under intense pressure from Rupert Murdoch, chairman of Fox parent News Corp, and the mogul's No. 2 executive, Peter Chernin. Mechanic confirmed in an interview that he was leaving, calling it a resignation. But other sources said Chernin fired Mechanic, and informed Murdoch about it. In 2026, Mechanic stated that Murdoch was never in approval of Mechanic's tendency to greenlight art films and following the string of underwhelming box office performances of art films in 1999 and early 2000 like Pushing Tin, Fight Club, Anna and the King, and The Beach, he was outed.

=== 2001–present ===
In 2001, Mechanic became the president of the jury at the Berlin International Film Festival.

In 2006, Mechanic became the jury of international competition at the Tokyo International Film Festival.

In 2007, Mechanic became the head of the jury of the Lion of the Future prize for first-time filmmakers at the Venice International Film Festival.

In 2010, Mechanic and Adam Shankman produced the 82nd Academy Awards.

In 2015, Mechanic produced Hacksaw Ridge.

Mechanic is currently producing movies through his independent production company, Pandemonium Films.

== Filmography ==
=== As producer ===
Year	Title	Notes
2005	Dark Water	
2005	The New World	
2009	Coraline	BAFTA Children's Award – Best Feature Film; American Film Institute Awards – Best 10 Movies; Nominated – The Producers Guild of America Producer of the Year Award in Animated Theatrical Motion Pictures
2016	Hacksaw Ridge	Nominated – Academy Award for Best Picture
2017	2:22	
