= The Taking of Prince Harry =

2010 British TV docufiction

The Taking of Prince Harry is a 2010 British TV docufiction which shows the fictional capture of Prince Harry in Afghanistan. It shows the Cabinet Office Briefing Room committee going into action, and his eventual escape during a US drone attack. The film stars Sam Reid as Prince Harry.

It was shown on 21 October on Channel 4. The show has been the subject of controversy, with the British military saying that it could be distressing for the families of the soldiers serving in Afghanistan.
