= Long Face (song) =

2026 single by The Vampire Lestat

Single by The Vampire Lestat

from the EP Detroit
- Released: February 13, 2026
- Recorded: 2024
- Genre: Glam rock
- Length: 3:51
- Label: Lakeshore Records
- Songwriter: Daniel Hart
- Producers: Daniel Hart; Danny Reisch

The Vampire Lestat singles chronology
"Long Face" (2026)	"All Fall Down" (2026)

"Long Face" is a glam rock song by fictional character The Vampire Lestat, performed by Australian actor Sam Reid and written by American composer Daniel Hart for the third season of AMC's gothic horror series Interview with the Vampire, retitled The Vampire Lestat after Anne Rice's 1985 novel of the same name and its lead character, a vampire rock star. It was released as The Vampire Lestat's first official single on February 13, 2026, before it appeared on the episode "Detroit" that aired on June 7, 2026. It was featured on the EP Detroit that was released on June 9, 2026.

== Background ==
Sam Reid plays French vampire Lestat de Lioncourt on AMC's gothic horror television series Interview with the Vampire (2022–present), based on Anne Rice's 1976 novel of the same name. The third season was retitled The Vampire Lestat and was adapted from the 1985 novel of same name, in which Lestat becomes a rock star with the stage name The Vampire Lestat. Rice's inspiration for rock star Lestat was The Doors' lead vocalist Jim Morrison.

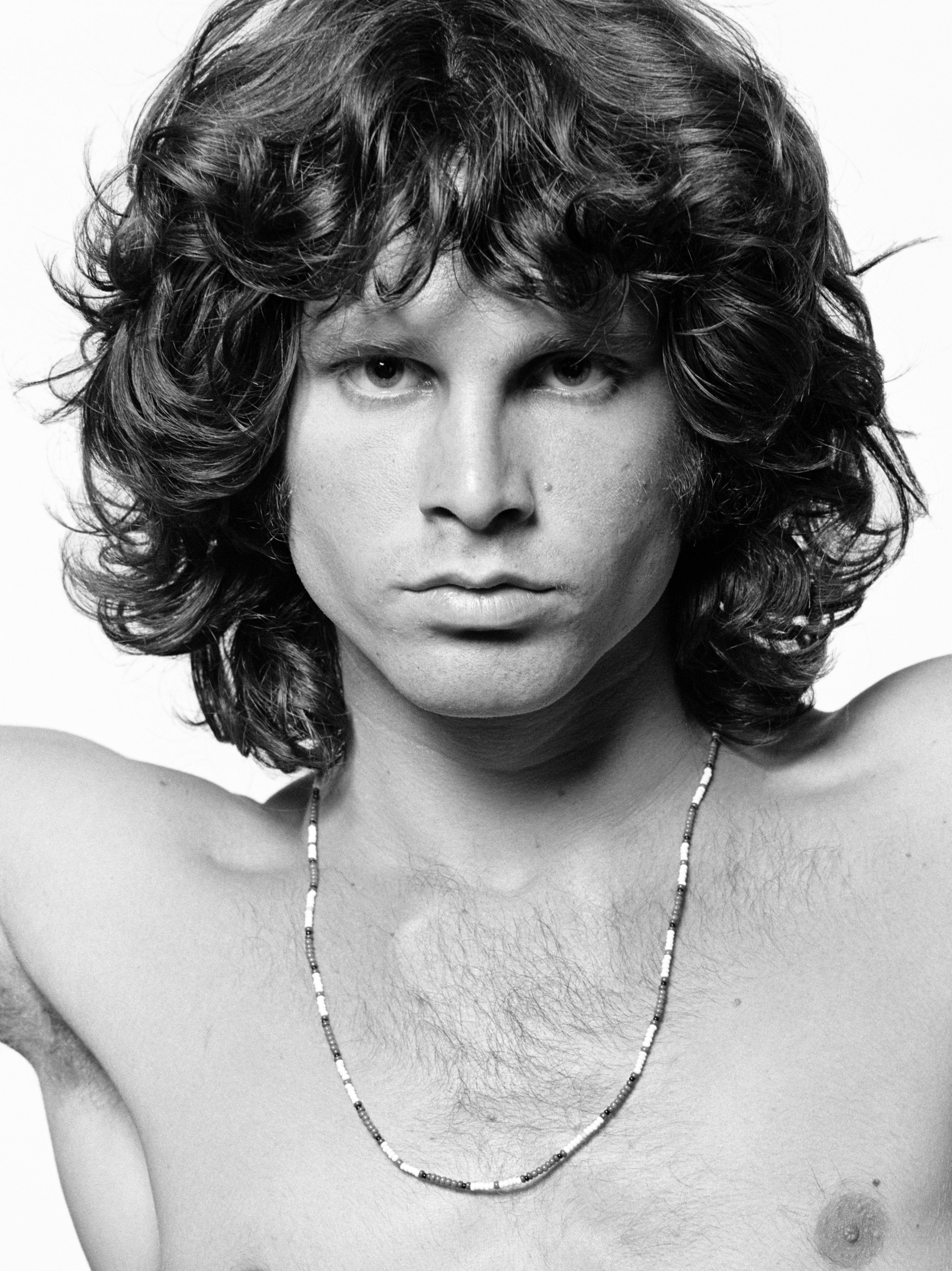
Anne Rice wrote The Vampire Lestat (1985) inspired by Jim Morrison, who is also one of the musical inspirations for the title character in the television series.

In season 1, Lestat was portrayed as a fan of opera and classically trained musician who sang and played the piano. On season 1 episode 6, "Like Angels Put in Hell by God", Lestat composed the song "Come to Me" (in which he sings and plays the piano) as an apology gift for his partner, Louis de Pointe du Lac (portrayed by Jacob Anderson). On season 2 episode 3, "No Pain", Lestat (in the form of a hallucination imagined by Louis) appears singing and playing the piano to a new rendition of the song with different lyrics, titled "Come to Me Again". Both versions were written by Daniel Hart and were featured on the series' soundtrack albums for season 1 and season 2, respectively.

In the last episode of season 2, "And That's the End of It. There's Nothing Else", which aired on July 30, 2024, Lestat appears playing a plank piano while listening to an instrumental song that was playing on an iPad; he then tells Louis that he was practicing because he was going on tour. In an interview with the Los Angeles Times on June 30, 2024, Interview with The Vampire's creator and showrunner Rolin Jones teased the direction that season 3 was going:

Lestat becomes a rock star. Let's start there. We're going to do a lot with that and are excited about potentially working with Daniel Hart who's done the music for the first two seasons. We're going to try to beat Hedwig and the Angry Inch and Rocky Horror. We're about to try to make a little pop masterpiece.

Jones originally wanted Lestat to be an orchestra conductor and told Reid to study piano and conducting during the first season, but both Reid and Hart told him that Lestat should remain a rock singer as he is in the book, and Jones ended up changing his mind. Jones told TV Guide in July 2024 that the musical inspirations for rock star Lestat on the series were David Bowie, Mick Jagger, Björk, Freddie Mercury, Mark Sandman, Franz Liszt, Otis Redding, Moses Sumney, Douglas Dare, Redd Kross, Lang Lang, Iggy Pop, St. Vincent, Prince, Florence Welch, Jim Morrison, T-Rex, Gustav Mahler, Brandon Flowers, Fiona Apple, Serge Gainsbourg, Electric Light Orchestra, The Sweet, Nick Cave, Raleigh Ritchie, Benjamin Clementine, Chappell Roan, Gustavo Dudamel, David Lee Roth, Ryan Kattner, John Cale, Jeff Mangum, Paul Westerberg, and Daniel Hart. Reid named Bowie, Kurt Cobain, and Jim Morrison as his personal influences for Lestat's rock star persona.

Hart and the series' writers developed the soundtrack for The Vampire Lestat together. Hart said they spent a lot of time discussing Rice's Lestat, rock music and trying to find a way to make the music work for modern viewers and listeners. "We talked about inspirations like Kurt Cobain, we talked about Otis Redding. Both of them have a vulnerable quality to their songwriting and their performance; a rawness that puts emotion at the forefront. That's what we wanted for Lestat, because that is what we already know to be true of him outside of singing. [We wanted] to bring that into his performance as a rockstar as well", Hart said.

== Writing and recording ==
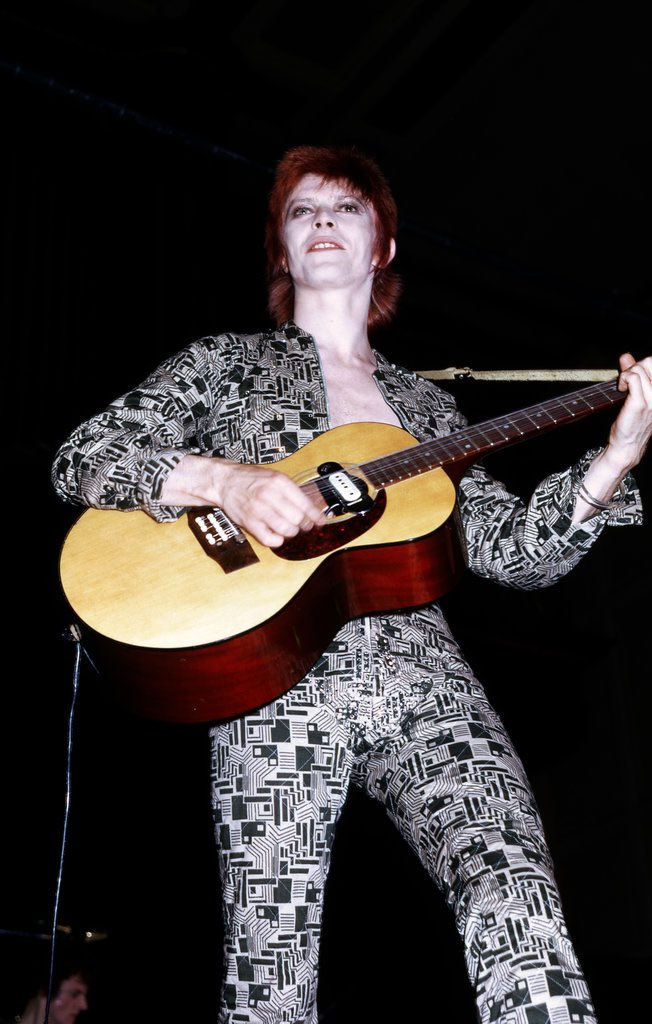
David Bowie and his 1970s stage persona Ziggy Stardust were the main influences for "Long Face".

The music and lyrics for "Long Face" were written by American composer Daniel Hart, who also produced the song along with Danny Reisch. The song was written and recorded in six weeks. Hart said the process happened "pretty fast" after showrunner Rolin Jones called him saying they needed a song for the 2024 San Diego Comic-Con, about a month before the event, which premiered a teaser trailer for season 3 of Interview with The Vampire featuring the song on July 27, 2024.

When asked if INXS lead vocalist Michael Hutchence was an inspiration for "Long Face" and rock star Lestat, Hart said:

Michael Hutchence spirit definitely hovering, though we were not intentionally trying to channel it. I listened to Kick obsessively in...junior high? My brother had the poster.

In a press release issued in February 2026, Hart said of the song:

Long Face is the first song I wrote for The Vampire Lestat. We decided early on to make David Bowie a big influence for Lestat's musical style and persona, and there's certainly some Ziggy Stardust in this song. But we chose Bowie not only for his glam era, but because he was a chameleon. Expect Lestat to change his musical colors throughout the season as well, as he discovers how to remain true to himself, and how to express that truth on stage every night.

The Vampire Lestat said of the song:

Long Face is the first song Daniel Hart "produced" for my album. He decided early on to steal where he could from Bowie because he hasn't had an original idea for five years now (is that his Green Knight score fading in the rear view?). As for Long Face, the bass should have walked down with the guitar at the end instead of pedaling on E. Predictable. Like everything Daniel Hart touches.

== Lyrics ==
The lyrics reference Lestat's hedonistic lifestyle. When Daniel Hart was asked about the meaning of the lyrics "We're boléro, prostitué", he explained on his Twitter account in August 2024:

I think lyrics should be subjective, and so we can each take from them what they would mean to us, based on our own life experience. Getting into specifics, I think our Lestat would enjoy writing lyrics with double or even triple entendre, so I tried to do that. Boléro is a romantic Spanish dance. And the way he and Louis sometimes treat each other is more transactional and less loving i.e. "prostitué". But our Lestat is also a massive fan of Maurice Ravel, who wrote perhaps the most currently famous Boléro of all. So in saying "We're Boléro", he could be expressing a deep fondness for what they are together. Some who knew Ravel said he frequented brothels, and because he never married or had kids, rumors abounded that he was homosexual. So, "prostitué" then takes on more potential meanings.

When asked if the lyrics "I get fatter when we break up" means that Lestat was going on a killing spree, Hart said:

That's a great interpretation. I was also thinking of Lestat actually gaining weight, as some people do with big life changes, added emotional stress, etc. AND Lestat just trolling him [Louis] a bit i.e. "what could I say that would get under his skin, make him feel bad?"

About the lyrics "Give me some face", Hart said: "I think the "give me some face" line is a bit less open to multiple interpretations i.e. that's a very specific reference from the show, a specific dig." On season 1 episode 3, "Is My Very Nature That of a Devil", Lestat admits that he was jealous of Louis with his childhood friend, Jonah, to which Louis tells Lestat: "He did me some face and I drove him home", referring to receiving oral sex from Jonah while he believed that Lestat was with his human lover, Antoinette, but Lestat was actually watching Louis and Jonah in the woods. Lestat then yells at Louis: "I heard your hearts dancing!".

== Release ==
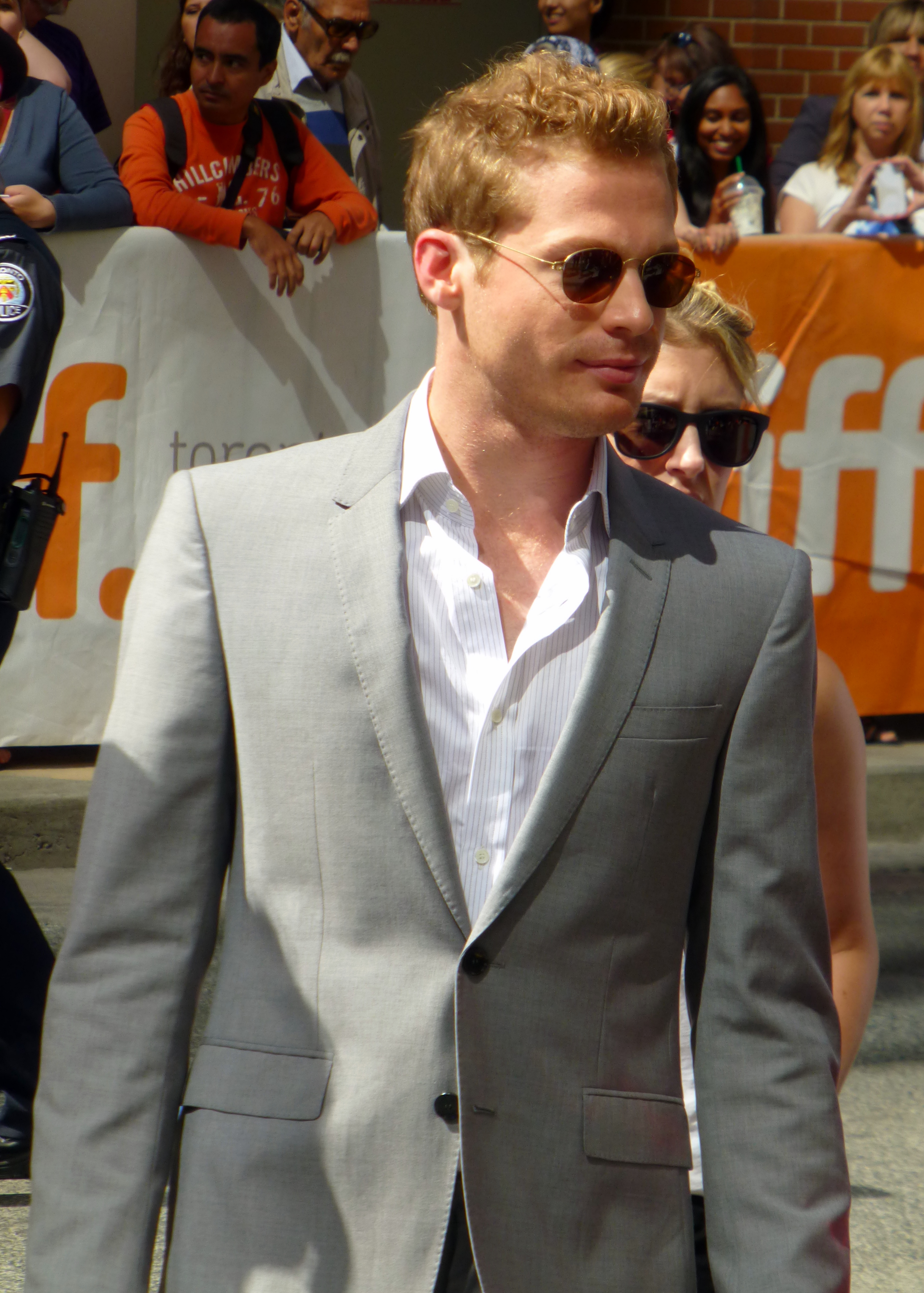
Sam Reid performed "Long Face" as The Vampire Lestat.

An earlier version of "Long Face" was featured on a teaser trailer for season 3 of Interview with the Vampire released at San Diego Comic-Con on July 27, 2024, followed by a lyric video with the full song released on YouTube the next day. As of October 2026, the lyric video has over 1 million views on YouTube. In November 2025, the song was featured in the television series Talamasca: The Secret Order, on episode 5, "The Puzzle Place", coming through the speakers of a bar.

Artist profiles for The Vampire Lestat appeared online on streaming services on February 12, 2026, following AMC Networks's official social media accounts posting a video of static with the logo for The Vampire Lestat on it with a caption that read: "You might get lucky."

Long Face was officially released as a single by AMC Networks and Lakeshore Records on streaming services on February 13, 2026, A karaoke version of the song was released by AMC on YouTube the following day. before appearing on the episode "Detroit" from The Vampire Lestat that aired on June 7, 2026, with Lestat performing the song on stage. The song was featured on the EP Detroit that was released on June 9, 2026.

On June 2, 2026, Reid performed "Long Face" live for the first time during a one-night-only concert in which he performed in character as The Vampire Lestat at the Beacon Theatre in New York City.

=== Release history ===
Release dates and formats for "Long Face"
Region	Date	Format(s)	Label(s)	Ref.
Various	July 28, 2024	Streaming	Lakeshore Records; AMC Networks	
Various	February 13, 2026	Digital download; streaming	Lakeshore Records; AMC Networks	
Various	June 7, 2026	TV premiere	Lakeshore Records; AMC Networks	

== Reception ==
=== Critical response ===
Maggie Boccella of Fangoria wrote about the song: "The music echoes the early sounds of David Bowie — post "Space Oddity" and pre "Let's Dance" — with a guitar reminiscent of T. Rex's "20th Century Boy", evoking a very 1970s style and sound for the famous vamp going into the new season."

=== Streaming ===
As of June 2026, "Long Face" has over 1 million streams on Spotify.

== Personnel ==
Credits adapted from Tidal.

- Sam Reid (as The Vampire Lestat) (Note: Sam Reid was credited as "The Vampire Lestat" on streaming platforms.) – lead vocals
- Daniel Hart – producer
- Danny Reisch – producer, recording engineer, mixer
- Max Lorenzen – recording engineer
- Howie Weinberg – mastering engineer
- Will Borza – mastering engineer
