= Sam Reid (actor) =

Australian actor (born 1987)

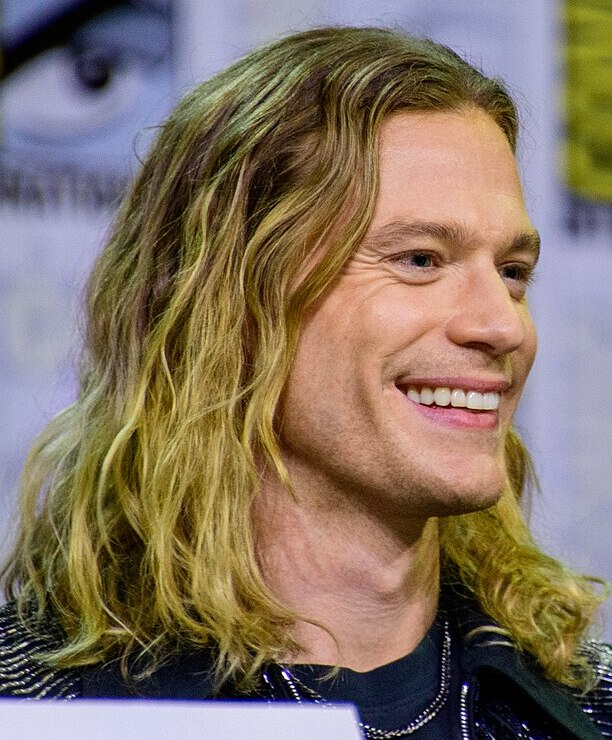
- Reid in 2025
- Born: 19 February 1987 (age 39); New South Wales, Australia
- Education: London Academy of Music and Dramatic Art (2010)
- Occupation: Actor
- Years active: 2007–present
- Partner: Philippa Northeast (2018–present)
- Relatives: Rupert Reid (brother)

Sam Reid (born 19 February 1987) is an Australian actor. He is best known for playing Lestat de Lioncourt in the AMC drama series Interview with the Vampire (2022–present), for which he received a Critics' Choice Television Award nomination. He received four AACTA Award nominations for his leading roles in The Newsreader (2021–2025) and Lambs of God (2019). Reid also played John Davinier in Belle (2013) and Hugo Fraser-Tyrwhitt in The Riot Club (2014).

== Early life and education ==
Sam Reid was born on 19 February 1987, in New South Wales, Australia. He was raised on a cattle property in the Monaro region. Reid is of Irish descent from his mother's side. He has an older brother, Rupert Reid, who is also an actor, and a sister, Kali Reid, who is a producer.

Reid developed a love of acting at the age of six. As children, he and his brother would stage plays and cabaret performances in the cattle shed on the property. Reid played the role of Hamlet whilst at high school. Expressing his admiration for Orson Welles, Reid said, "I will never stop marvelling over Citizen Kane. It's impossible to think that that film was made by a 26-year-old. It's impossible to think that he had that confidence and that talent so early."

Reid attended Cranbrook School, a private boys' school in Sydney. After graduating, he made his television debut with a small role in the Australian medical drama All Saints. Reid then moved to London to study acting at the London Academy of Music and Dramatic Art (LAMDA). He graduated in 2010, having been named star student of his year.

== Career ==
=== Film and television ===
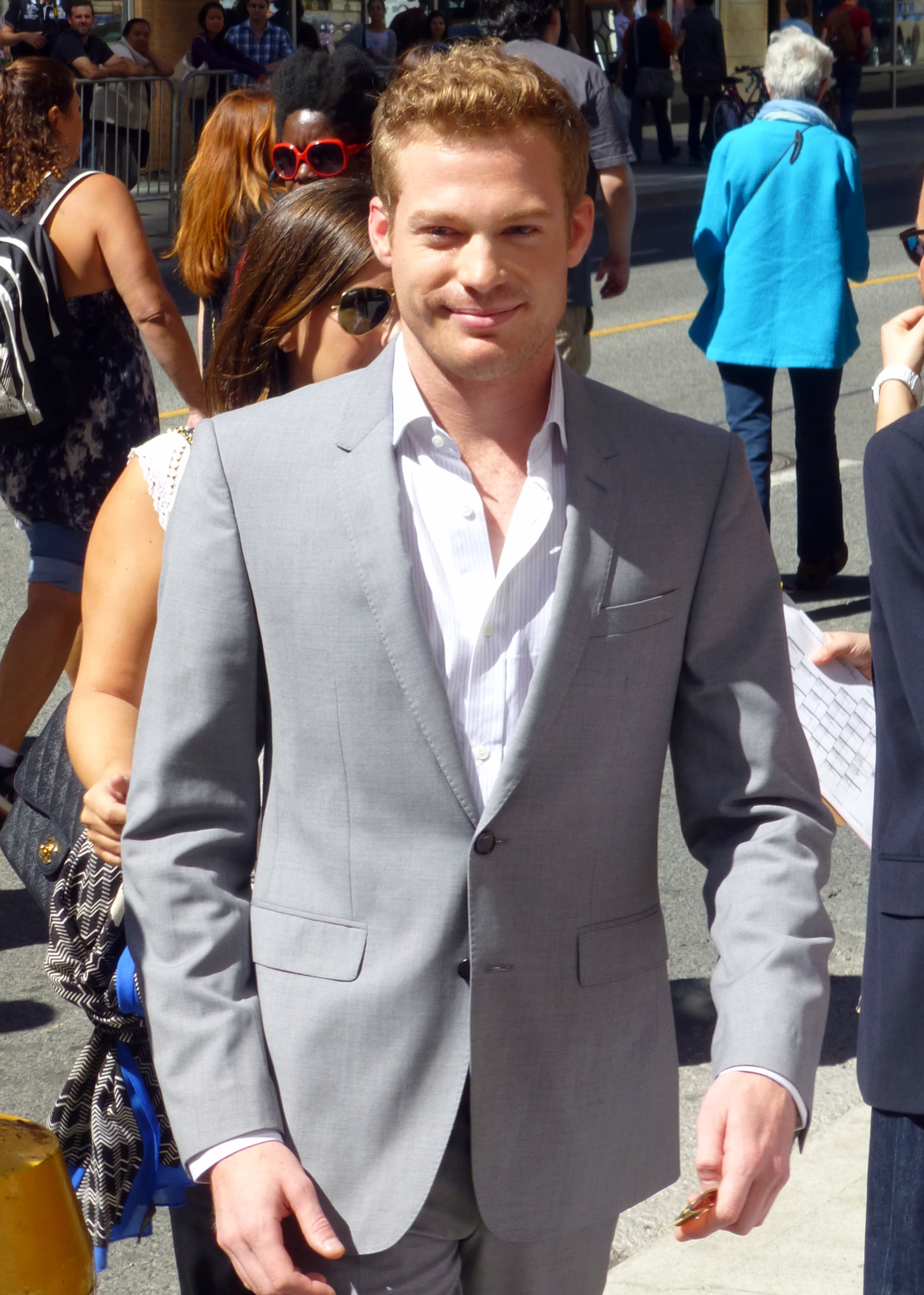
Reid at Belle premiere, TIFF 2013

In 2010, Reid played Prince Harry in The Taking of Prince Harry, a Channel 4 docufiction exploring a hypothetical scenario in which Prince Harry is kidnapped whilst serving in Afghanistan. During his final semester at LAMDA, Reid had the opportunity to audition for a role in Anonymous (2011). Although he did not receive a script prior to the audition, he was offered the role of the Earl of Essex the next day. At that time, he was credited as Sebastian Reid.

Reid portrayed the young Harry Pearce in series ten of the BBC drama Spooks in 2011. The following year, he played Brian Lomax in the pilot episode of Endeavour and Tolbert McCoy, the son of Randolph McCoy, in the American Civil War miniseries Hatfields & McCoys.

In the period drama Belle (2013), he played John Davinier opposite Gugu Mbatha-Raw's Belle. He was cast relatively late in pre-production after actor Sam Claflin left the project due to scheduling conflicts. That same year, Reid played Young Finlay in the war film The Railway Man, alongside Stellan Skarsgård, who portrayed the older version of the character.

In 2014, Reid appeared in '71 as Second Lieutenant Armitage, an inexperienced commanding officer deployed to Belfast at the height of The Troubles. He later played Hugo, "a louche postgrad", in The Riot Club, a film adaptation of Laura Wade's Bullingdon Club-inspired play Posh. The following year, Reid portrayed American astronaut John Glenn in The Astronaut Wives Club, a historical drama series based on Lily Koppel's book of the same name. The book focuses on the lives of the Mercury Seven astronauts' wives.

Reid appeared in the music video for Flume's song "Never Be Like You" alongside Sophie Lowe in 2016. That year, he also played the young Alexander "Sasha" Ivanov in Shamim Sarif's Cold War espionage film Despite the Falling Snow and John Cree, a "failed playwright" and a "controlling husband" in The Limehouse Golem.

In 2017, Reid played DCI Len Bradfield in Prime Suspect 1973 opposite Stefanie Martini, who portrayed the young Jane Tennison. The series is a prequel to the original series Prime Suspect (1991-2006), which starred Helen Mirren in the lead role. Reid then starred in the supernatural thriller 2:22 (2017), alongside Michiel Huisman and Teresa Palmer.

In 2019, Reid played Mikey, the boyfriend of Sunny, in Standing Up for Sunny, a rom-com that "successfully breaks down barriers around disability and mental illness". That same year, he played Young Max opposite Phoebe Tonkin in the supernatural mystery Bloom, which centres around an enchanted plant that can revive physical youth. Reid portrayed young teacher Ray in the drama miniseries The Hunting (2019). It explores a teen nude photo scandal affecting schools and families while exposing systemic misogyny. In the gothic drama Lambs of God (2019), Reid played Father Ignatius, a priest assigned to reclaim a monastery for the church by relocating the last three nuns of the Order of St. Agnes. The nuns were portrayed by Ann Dowd, Essie Davis, and Jessica Barden. According to Dom Fisher of Geek Vibe Nation, Reid "goes through such a transformative metamorphosis that only a skilled actor could pull off". His performance earned him his first nomination for the AACTA Award for Best Lead Actor in a Television Drama.

In 2021, Reid portrayed Sergeant Klintoff in Leah Purcell's feature directorial debut, The Drover's Wife, a First Nations revisionist Western thriller. From 2021 to 2025, Reid played rising news presenter Dale Jennings in the ABC series The Newsreader. Kelsie Mattson of Collider described his performance as "demonstrative of Reid's range", whilst Helen Hawkins of The Arts Desk praised his "impressively delicate performance, an unnamed fear lurking behind his confident smile". For this role, Reid received three AACTA Awards for Best Lead Actor in a Television Drama nominations.

Since 2022, Reid has starred as Lestat de Lioncourt in the AMC television series Interview with the Vampire. His performance has received widespread praise from critics. Kayleigh Donaldson of Consequence described Reid's performance as "directly taken from the novels, as opposed to the camp eccentricity of Tom Cruise". Reid was included in IndieWire's 28 Best Film and TV Performances of 2022, which stated: "Every minute of Reid's performance here is a master class in manipulation". Similarly, Daniel Fienberg of The Hollywood Reporter praised Reid's ability to "convincingly command every room" in his review of the series. He was nominated for the 2025 Critics' Choice Television Award for Best Supporting Actor in a Drama Series for his performance. In 2026, Reid released the singles "Long Face", "All Fall Down", a cover of Billy Idol's "Dancing with Myself", "Butterscotch Bitch", and "Your Biggest Fan" for the series' third season The Vampire Lestat, renamed after Anne Rice's 1985 novel of same name, in which Lestat becomes a rock star. Reid was credited in the songs as The Vampire Lestat. On 2 June 2026, Reid performed a one-night only concert in-character at the Beacon Theatre in New York City.

=== Theatre ===
In 2011, Reid played Soranzo in 'Tis Pity She's a Whore at the Leeds Playhouse alongside Sara Vickers and Damien Molony. He later played Gene Laine in The Old Vic and Noël Coward Theatre productions of the musical Girl from the North Country (2017–2018), alongside Claudia Jolly, Sheila Atim, Shirley Henderson, and Ciarán Hinds. In June 2026, Reid is set to join Pamela Rabe in a production of Doubt: A Parable for Sydney Theatre Company at Roslyn Packer Theatre.

== Personal life ==
Reid is private about his personal life and not on any social media. Since 2018, Reid has been dating Australian actress Philippa Northeast after starring in the film Standing Up for Sunny together. They have a blue heeler dog named Rani.

== Filmography ==
=== Film ===
List of films, with release year, role and note
Year	Title	Role	Notes	Ref.
2011	Anonymous	Earl of Essex	Credited as Sebastian Reid	
2012	Inhuman Resources	William Tucker		
2013	The Railway Man	Younger Finlay		
2013	Belle	John Davinier		
2014	'71	2nd Lt. Armitage		
2014	The Riot Club	Hugo Fraser-Tyrwhitt		
2014	Tigers	Frank		
2014	Serena	Vaughn		
2016	Despite the Falling Snow	Alexander Ivanov		
2016	The Limehouse Golem	John Cree		
2017	After the Smoke	Narrator (voice)	Short film	
2017	2:22	Jonas Edman		
2019	Standing Up for Sunny	Mikey		
2019	Waiting for the Barbarians	The Lieutenant		
2021	The Drover's Wife: The Legend of Molly Johnson	Sgt. Nate Klintoff		

=== Television ===
List of television series, with release year, role and note
Year	Title	Role	Notes	Ref.
2007	All Saints	Marty Arent	Episode: "The Hardest Word"	
2010	The Taking of Prince Harry	Prince Harry	TV film (credited as Sebastian Reid)	
2011	Spooks	Young Harry	3 episodes	
2012	Endeavour	Brian Lomax	Pilot episode	
2012	Whitechapel	Damon Nelson	Series 3, episode 4	
2012	Hatfields & McCoys	Tolbert McCoy	Miniseries	
2013	Agatha Christie's Marple	Nat Fletcher	Episode: "Greenshaw's Folly"	
2015	The Astronaut Wives Club	John Glenn	Main role	
2017	Prime Suspect 1973	DI Len Bradfield	Main role; miniseries	
2019	Bloom	Young Max	3 episodes	
2019	Lambs of God	Father Ignatius Jones	Main role; miniseries	
2019	The Hunting	Ray	Main role; miniseries	
2021–25	The Newsreader	Dale Jennings	Lead role	
2022–present	Interview with the Vampire	Lestat de Lioncourt	Lead role	

=== Music video ===
List of music videos, with release year, title, artist and note
Year	Title	Performer	Notes	Ref.
2016	"Never Be Like You"	Flume	With Sophie Lowe	

=== Stage ===
List of stage performances, with year, title, role and venue
Year	Production	Venue	Role	Notes	Ref.
2010	One Night in November	Belgrade Theatre, Coventry	Michael	Credited as Sebastian Reid	
2011	'Tis Pity She's a Whore	Leeds Playhouse, Leeds	Soranzo	Credited as Sebastian Reid	
2017–2018	Girl from the North Country	The Old Vic, London; Noël Coward Theatre, London	Gene Laine	Written and directed by Conor McPherson	
2026	Doubt: A Parable	Roslyn Packer Theatre, Sydney	Father Flynn		

== Discography ==
List of songs, with release year and soundtrack title
Year	Soundtrack	Song	Notes	Ref.
2017	Girl from the North Country	"I Want You"	with Claudia Jolly	
2022	Interview with the Vampire	"Come to Me"		
2024	Interview with the Vampire	"Come to Me Again"		
2026	Interview with the Vampire	"Long Face"	as the Vampire Lestat	
2026	Interview with the Vampire	"All Fall Down"	as the Vampire Lestat	
2026	Interview with the Vampire	"Dancing with Myself"	as the Vampire Lestat	
2026	Interview with the Vampire	"Butterscotch Bitch"	as the Vampire Lestat	
2026	Interview with the Vampire	"Your Biggest Fan"	as the Vampire Lestat	

== Accolades ==
Awards and nominations received by Sam Reid
Award	Year (Note: The listed year refers to the date of the ceremony.)	Category	Work	Result	Ref.
AACTA Awards	2019	Best Lead Actor – Drama	Lambs of God	Nominated	
AACTA Awards	2021	Best Lead Actor – Drama	The Newsreader	Nominated	
AACTA Awards	2024	Best Lead Actor – Drama	The Newsreader	Nominated	
AACTA Awards	2026	Best Lead Actor – Drama	The Newsreader	Nominated	
Astra TV Awards	2025	Best Supporting Actor in a Drama Series	Interview with the Vampire	Nominated	
Astra TV Awards	2025	Best Cast Ensemble in a Cable Drama Series	Interview with the Vampire	Nominated	
Critics' Choice Super Awards	2023	Best Actor in a Horror Series	Interview with the Vampire	Nominated	
Critics' Choice Television Awards	2025	Best Supporting Actor in a Drama Series	Interview with the Vampire	Nominated	
Equity Ensemble Awards	2020	Outstanding Performance by an Ensemble Series in a Mini-Series/Telemovie	The Hunting	Won	
Equity Ensemble Awards	2022	Outstanding Performance by an Ensemble Series in a Drama Series	The Newsreader	Won	
Logie Awards	2022	Most Outstanding Actor	The Newsreader	Nominated	
Logie Awards	2024	Best Lead Actor in a Drama	The Newsreader	Nominated	
Pride Awards	2025	Best Supporting (Actor)	Interview with the Vampire	Nominated	
Pride Awards	2025	Best Ensemble Cast (Series or Miniseries)	Interview with the Vampire	Won	
