= Hymns for a Dark Horse =

Studio album by Bowerbirds
- Released: 2007
- Genre: Folk
- Length: 41:48
- Language: English
- Label: Burly Time/Dead Oceans

Bowerbirds chronology
Hymns for a Dark Horse (2007)	Upper Air (2009)

Professional ratings
Review scores
Source	Rating
AllMusic	3.5/5 stars
Pitchfork Media	8.4/10
PopMatters	7/10

Hymns for a Dark Horse is an album by Bowerbirds. It is Bowerbirds’ debut album, originally released in July 2007 on Burly Time Records, then reissued by Dead Oceans in expanded form in June 2008 with two bonus tracks. The album is strongly tied to ecology, rural life, Anti-consumerism, and spiritual/natural imagery. PopMatters described it as music of “conflict, hurt, and persistent faith,” resisting industrial and materialist damage while remaining invitational rather than merely polemical.

== Track listing ==
No.	Title	Length
1.	"Hooves"	2:41
2.	"In Our Talons"	3:54
3.	"Human Hands"	3:20
4.	"Dark Horse"	4:34
5.	"Bur Oak"	5:01
6.	"My Oldest Memory"	4:31
7.	"The Marbled Godwit"	4:00
8.	"Slow Down"	3:54
9.	"The Ticonderoga"	4:31
10.	"Olive Hearts"	5:28
11.	"La Denigración [Bonus Track]"	3:17
12.	"Matchstick Maker [Bonus Track]"	4:40
