= Bowerbirds (band) =

American folk band

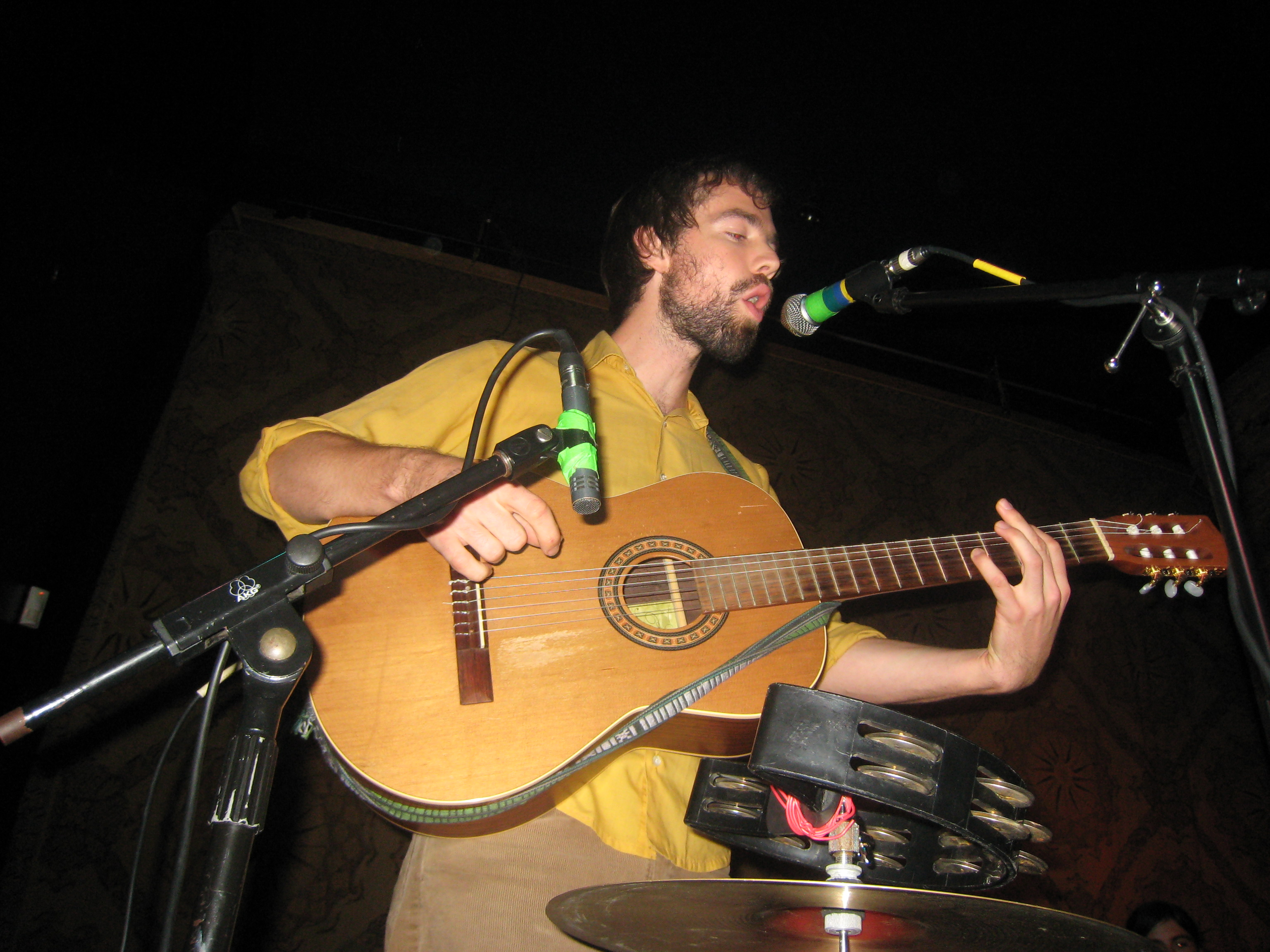
- Bowerbirds in Philadelphia, PA

Background information
- Genres: Indie folk
- Years active: 2006–present
- Labels: Burly Time Records; Dead Oceans
- Members: Philip Moore
- Past members: Beth Tacular; Yan Westerlund; Mark Paulson; Will Hackney; Leah Gibson
- Website: www.bowerbirds.org

Bowerbirds is an American folk band formed in Raleigh, North Carolina, United States, in 2006. The group comprises Philip Moore (vocals, guitar), Beth Tacular (accordion, vocals) and Mark Paulson (violin, vocals). Allmusic writer Stewart Mason places their sound on "the dividing line between the freak folk contingent led by Devendra Banhart and Joanna Newsom and the more straightforward sunshine pop of Lavender Diamond." Their debut album, Hymns for a Dark Horse, released under Burly Time Records in 2007, received favorable reviews from publications such as Pitchfork, Time Out New York and Prefix Magazine. Bowerbirds have toured in support of The Mountain Goats, with John Darnielle referring to the band as his "favorite new band in forever". Their second album, Upper Air, was released July 7, 2009. The band released The Clearing on March 6, 2012. Their most recent offering was 2021's "becalmyounglovers," which was released on April 30.

== Discography ==
=== Studio albums ===
- Hymns for a Dark Horse (2007)
- Upper Air (2009)
- The Clearing (2012)
- becalmyounglovers (2021)

=== EPs ===
- Danger at Sea (2006)
- Lost Souls EP (2013)
- Endless Chase: 2020 Singles (2020)
- Azaleas (2020)

=== Singles ===
- Northern Lights (2009)
- In Our Talons (2009)
- In the Yard / Always an Ear to Bend (2012)
- Endless Chase / High Rise (2020)
- Thrift Store / High Rise (2020)
- Seems Impossible (2020)

== Other appearances ==
- You Be My Heart (2013)
