= Upper Air =

Studio album by Bowerbirds
- Released: 2009
- Genre: Folk
- Length: 41:48
- Language: English
- Label: Dead Oceans

Bowerbirds chronology
Hymns for a Dark Horse (2007)	Upper Air (2009)	The Clearing (2012)

Upper Air is the second studio album by the American folk band Bowerbirds. It was released in 2009.

== Reception ==
Professional ratings
Aggregate scores
Source	Rating
Metacritic	76/100
Review scores
Source	Rating
AllMusic	3.5/5 stars
Consequence of Sound	4/5 stars
NME	9/10
The Observer	(favorable)
Paste	8.5/10
Pitchfork Media	7.2/10

Upper Air was well received by critics, scoring 76 out of 100 on Metacritic, which indicates "generally favorable reviews", based on 16 reviews.

== Track listing ==
No.	Title	Length
1.	"House of Diamonds"	2:58
2.	"Teeth"	4:10
3.	"Silver Clouds"	4:30
4.	"Beneath Your Tree"	3:40
5.	"Ghost Life"	5:24
6.	"Northern Lights"	2:54
7.	"Chimes"	4:18
8.	"Bright Future"	4:01
9.	"Crooked Lust"	4:04
10.	"This Day"	3:08
