= 2:22 (2017 film) =

2017 film by Paul Currie

- Theatrical release poster
- Directed by: Paul Currie
- Written by: Nathan Parker; Todd Stein
- Produced by: Bill Mechanic; Steve Hutensky; Paul Currie; Bruce Davey; Jodi Matterson
- Starring: Michiel Huisman; Teresa Palmer; Sam Reid
- Cinematography: David Eggby
- Edited by: William Hoy; Sean Lahiff; Gary Woodyard
- Music by: Lisa Gerrard; James Orr
- Production companies: Lightstream Pictures; Pandemonium Films; Walk The Walk Entertainment
- Distributed by: Magnet Releasing (United States); Icon Film Distribution (Australia)
- Release date: June 30, 2017
- Running time: 98 minutes
- Countries: United States; Australia
- Language: English
- Box office: $3.9 million

2:22 is a 2017 science fiction thriller film directed by Paul Currie, written by Nathan Parker and Todd Stein, and starring Michiel Huisman, Teresa Palmer and Sam Reid. The film's plot involves air traffic controller Dylan Branson, who, thanks to a mysterious anomaly at 2:22, prevented the collision of two aircraft and met Sarah, whose destinies appear to be tied to the time 2:22. The film was released in theaters and on VOD on June 30, 2017.

== Plot ==
Dylan Branson works as an air traffic controller at John F. Kennedy International Airport; he possesses the ability to visualize constellations and patterns, and though he has a pilot's license, he has a fear of flying. He has a recurring dream of a shooting occurring at Grand Central Terminal at 2:22 p.m. At work, Dylan begins hallucinating at 2:22 p.m, only able to break out from his fugue state just in time to prevent a collision between two planes. Following this, he is suspended from work, pending a full board review.

Dylan begins to realize that the same things happen to him at the same time every day, and by 2:21 he somehow arrives at Grand Central Terminal, where—although not the same individuals—he always sees the same type of people: a businessman reading a newspaper, an older couple embracing, a party of school children, and a pregnant woman standing alone under the clock. At exactly 2:22 p.m, an electrical malfunction causes the station glass to shatter.

At an aerial ballet, Dylan meets Sarah, who works at an art gallery with her ex-boyfriend Jonas and was a passenger on one of the nearly collided planes. Dylan and Sarah start a relationship upon discovering they have the same birthdate, but it is put on hold when Dylan starts a fight with Jonas upon discovering the latter's exhibition depicts the same events of the Grand Central Terminal he saw in his recurring dream.

Dylan learns through Sarah's colleague the story of a singer, Evelyn Mills, who is claimed to have been killed by her lover named Jake Redmond in the Grand Central Terminal murders 30 years ago out of jealousy. Dylan finds a packet of old letters written to Jake by Evelyn hidden in his apartment, revealing that Jake had once lived in his apartment.

Using the letters, Dylan tracks down Evelyn's sister, Catherine, who informs that Jake and Evelyn had also shared their same birthdays and fell deeply in love. She disbelieved the rumors told by a visiting detective named Noah Marks that Jake was a criminal. Catherine thinks that Noah, who is also the victim of the Grand Central Terminal murders, was also in love with Evelyn.

Piecing together, Dylan believes the supernova, which occurred on the day of Jake and Evelyn's deaths 30 years ago, the same day he and Sarah were born, is now reoccurring in a manner of a “cosmic cataclysm" and is convinced that he and Sarah are destined to relive Jake and Evelyn's fates. When Sarah visits him in his apartment, Dylan, fearing for her life, warns not to see him again. He contemplates suicide but stops when he sees a plane. A distressed Sarah confides in Jonas, who persuades her to go to Millhurst.

On his 30th birthday, Dylan discovers that the same patterns he's been experiencing had occurred to Jake on the day he died. He breaks into Jonas' studio, where he finds dozens of depictions of Sarah, a necklace identical to Evelyn's, and an empty gun case. Realizing that Jonas is obsessed with Sarah and planning to relive the Grand Central Terminal murders as Noah Marks, Dylan rushes for the Grand Central Terminal, whilst being pursued by the police.

After their flight is cancelled, Jonas buys tickets at Grand Central, where Sarah begins to see the same characters that Dylan described. It dawns on her that she is the pregnant woman under the clock, and she refuses to leave with Jonas. In a jealous rage, Jonas calls her Evelyn, and Sarah realizes that they are reliving the same fateful day. Dylan arrives and Jonas fires at Sarah but Dylan takes a hit himself to save Sarah's life. Jonas is then shot and killed by the arriving police officers.

It has transpired that, in his jealous rage, Noah gunned down both Jake and Evelyn, before he was himself shot dead by Jake in an act of self-defense, which he was framed for by the police.

After the incident, Dylan has recovered from his injuries and has now become a pilot, living happily with Sarah and their newborn baby.

== Cast ==
- Michiel Huisman as Dylan Branson, an air traffic controller at New York's JFK Airport, who possess a unique ability to visualize patterns.
- Teresa Palmer as Sarah, a passenger on board an arriving flight during a near mid-air collision
- Sam Reid as Jonas, Sarah's ex-boyfriend
- Duncan Ragg as Jake
- Jessica Clarke as Evelyn
- Jack Ellis as Noah
- John Waters as Bill, Dylan's boss
- Maeve Dermody as Sandy, Dylan's ex-girlfriend
- Mitchell Butel as Howard Hutton
- Remy Hii as Benny
- Richard Davies as Inky
- Kerry Armstrong as Catherine
- Simone Kessell as Serena
- Zara Michales as Ellie
- George Papura as New York Tradesman

== Production ==
2:22 was produced by Pandemonium's Bill Mechanic, Walk The Walk Entertainment's Steve Hutensky and Lightstream Pictures' Paul Currie. Garrett Kelleher of Lightstream, David Fountain and Kel West of Flywheel Entertainment and Jackie O’Sullivan served as executive producers. Although the film is set in New York City, the actual filming location was in Fox Studios Australia and Moore Park in Sydney, Australia.

Armie Hammer was attached to the film, before Huisman took on the role.

== Release ==
Released on June 30, 2017, 2:22 grossed $3.9 million worldwide.

== Reception ==
On Rotten Tomatoes the film has an approval rating of 20% based on reviews from 10 critics.

Nick Allen of RogerEbert.com wrote: "With a movie like this, it's hard to tell where the good idea ran out, as it seems to have been lost many drafts ago." Todd Jorgenson of Cinemalogue wrote: "The many contrivances diminish the potential for emotional investment in the characters - or figuring out what's happening to them and why." Brian Orndorf of Blu-ray.com gave the film a grade "D", and wrote: "Currie can't connect the dots in a fascinating way, with the entire effort resembling more of a screenwriting exercise than a hypnotic overview of celestial guidance."

Edward Douglas of Film Journal International called the film "An intriguing exploration of fate vs. circumstance and coincidence that ends up being far better than it should be, but only if it's not taken too seriously." Danielle Solzman of Solzy at the Movies wrote: "If Groundhog Day had been made as a thriller, it's possible that 2:22 could have been that film."
