= The B-Sides (band) =

American rock band

The B-Sides are a rock band formed in 2000 in Chapel Hill, North Carolina. Noah Smith, the vocalist formed the band at the School of the Arts in Winston-Salem, North Carolina recruiting fellow guitarist Ari Picker and keyboardist Travis Horton.

Smith's mother knew Ken Mosher, formerly of the Squirrel Nut Zippers, who recorded the band and joined as a bassist. Eric Kuhn joined the band as the drummer. They recorded an EP Two Beautiful Beaches and then released an album Yes Indeed the B-Sides Quite in 2001 which was reviewed in Billboard Magazine.

By the end of 2002, Mosher, Kuhn, and Horton had left the band being replaced by brothers Jonny and Joah Tunnell, formerly of the band Vibrant Green, on bass and drums, respectively. The new lineup quickly changed their name to The Never. Picker has since gone on to form the band Lost in the Trees, signed to ANTI-Records.

== Discography ==
- Two Beautiful Beaches EP 2001
- Yes Indeed the B-Sides Quite 2001
