= Trekky Records =

Independent record label

- Founded: 2001
- Founder: Martin Anderson; Will Hackney
- Distributor(s): Redeye Distribution
- Genre: Indie rock, folk, hip hop
- Country of origin: U.S.
- Location: Chapel Hill, North Carolina
- Official website: trekkyrecords.com

Trekky Records is an independent record label based in Chapel Hill, North Carolina. The label was created in 2001 by Chapel Hill natives Martin Anderson and Will Hackney (while the two were still in middle school and high school, respectively) as an outlet for their friends' music. The label has since grown into a prominent musical collective, known for releasing albums in a signature 3-part format which includes a vinyl record, a compact disc, and an MP3 download.

== Artists ==
- Allelai
- Alvarez Painting
- Auxiliary House
- Barghest
- The Beauregards
- Brice Randall Bickford
- Butterflies
- Choose Your Own Adventure
- Phil Cook
- Embarrassing Fruits
- Endless Mic
- Loamlands
- Lost in the Trees
- Mortar and Pestle
- The Never
- The Physics of Meaning
- Straight No Chaser
- Sylvan Esso
- The Trekky Yuletide Orchestra
- Vibrant Green
- Westfalia
