= Why the Long Face =

Why the Long Face may refer to:

- Why the Long Face (album), 1995 album by Big Country
- "Why the Long Face" (song), 2003 song by Manitoba/Caribou
