= Lost in the Trees =

American orchestral folk pop band

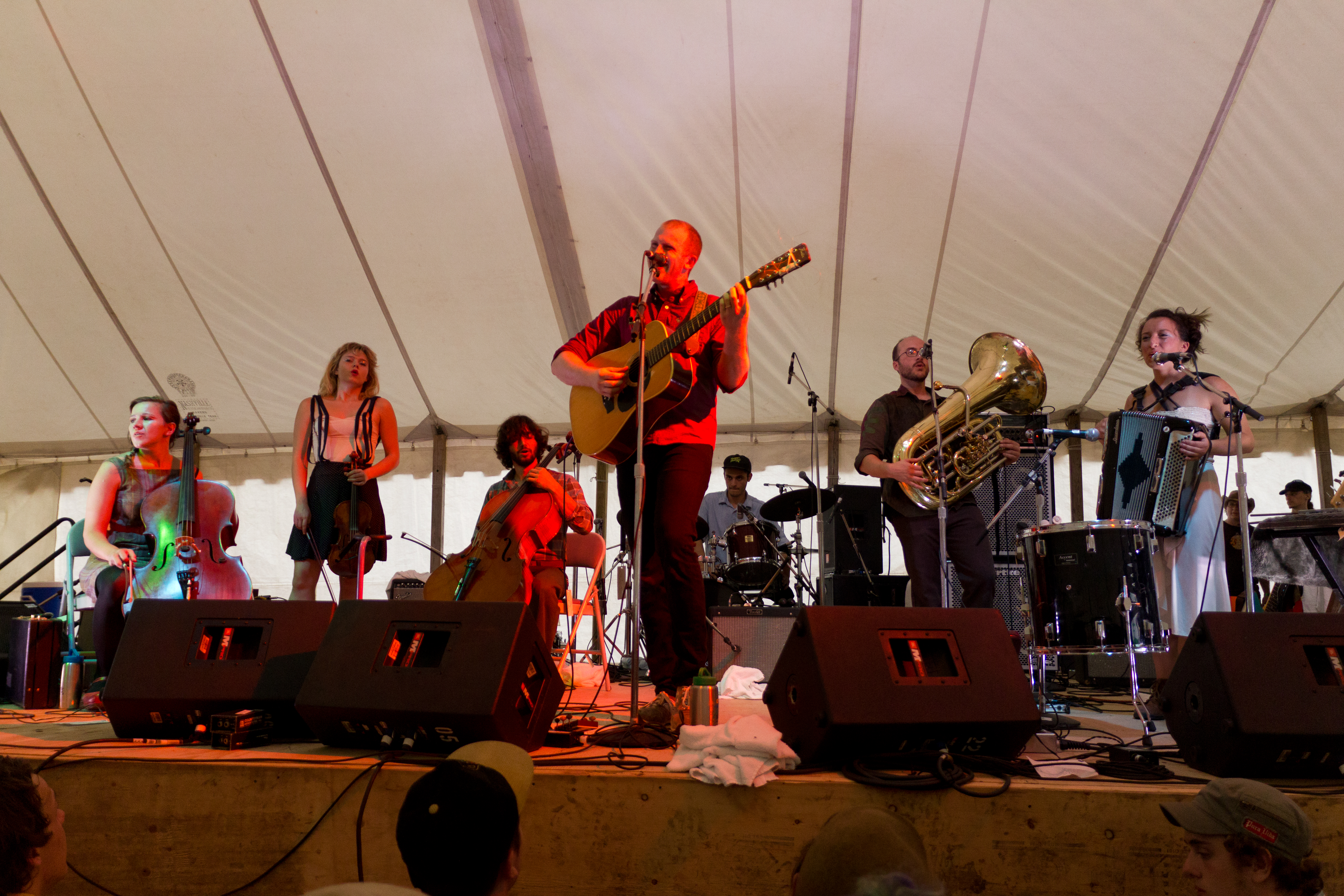
- Lost in the Trees performing at the 2011 Hillside Festival

Background information
- Origin: Chapel Hill, North Carolina
- Genres: Folk, indie, orchestral
- Years active: 2007–14
- Labels: Anti, Trekky
- Members: Ari Picker; Emma Nadeau; Joah Tunnell; Mark Daumen; Peter Lewis
- Past members: Will Hackney; Scott Carle; Leah Gibson; Jenavieve Varga; Andrew Anagnost; Daniel Westerlund
- Website: www.lostinthetrees.com (archived)

Lost in the Trees was an American orchestral folk pop band from Chapel Hill, North Carolina. The lineup consisted of Ari Picker (writer/vocals), Emma Nadeau (french horn/vocals), Drew Anagnost (cello), Jenavieve Varga (violin), and Mark Daumen (tuba). Lead singer Picker cites diverse influence such as Beethoven, Radiohead, Vivaldi, Neutral Milk Hotel, Saint-Saëns, and OutKast, among others. Paste Magazine described its music as "mountaintop chamber music, a happy marriage of old folk traditions and even older orchestral ones," and listed the band among "The 20 Best New Bands of 2010."

== History ==
Lost in the Trees formed in 2007 when lead singer/guitarist Ari Picker, a native of Chapel Hill, North Carolina, assembled a group of musicians to record the EP Time Taunts Me on Trekky Records. Picker had previously been a member of The B-Sides. After studying at Berklee College of Music, he decided to attempt a more orchestral effort. Following the release of Time Taunts Me, Picker moved back to North Carolina and assembled a band drawn from the University of North Carolina's orchestral program and the pool of players connected with Trekky Records.

The lineup consisted of Picker (writer/vocals), Emma Nadeau (french horn/vocals), Drew Anagnost (cello), Jenavieve Varga (violin), and Mark Daumen (tuba). In 2010, Paste Magazine listed the band among "The 20 Best New Bands of 2010."

=== All Alone in an Empty House and signing to ANTI-Records ===
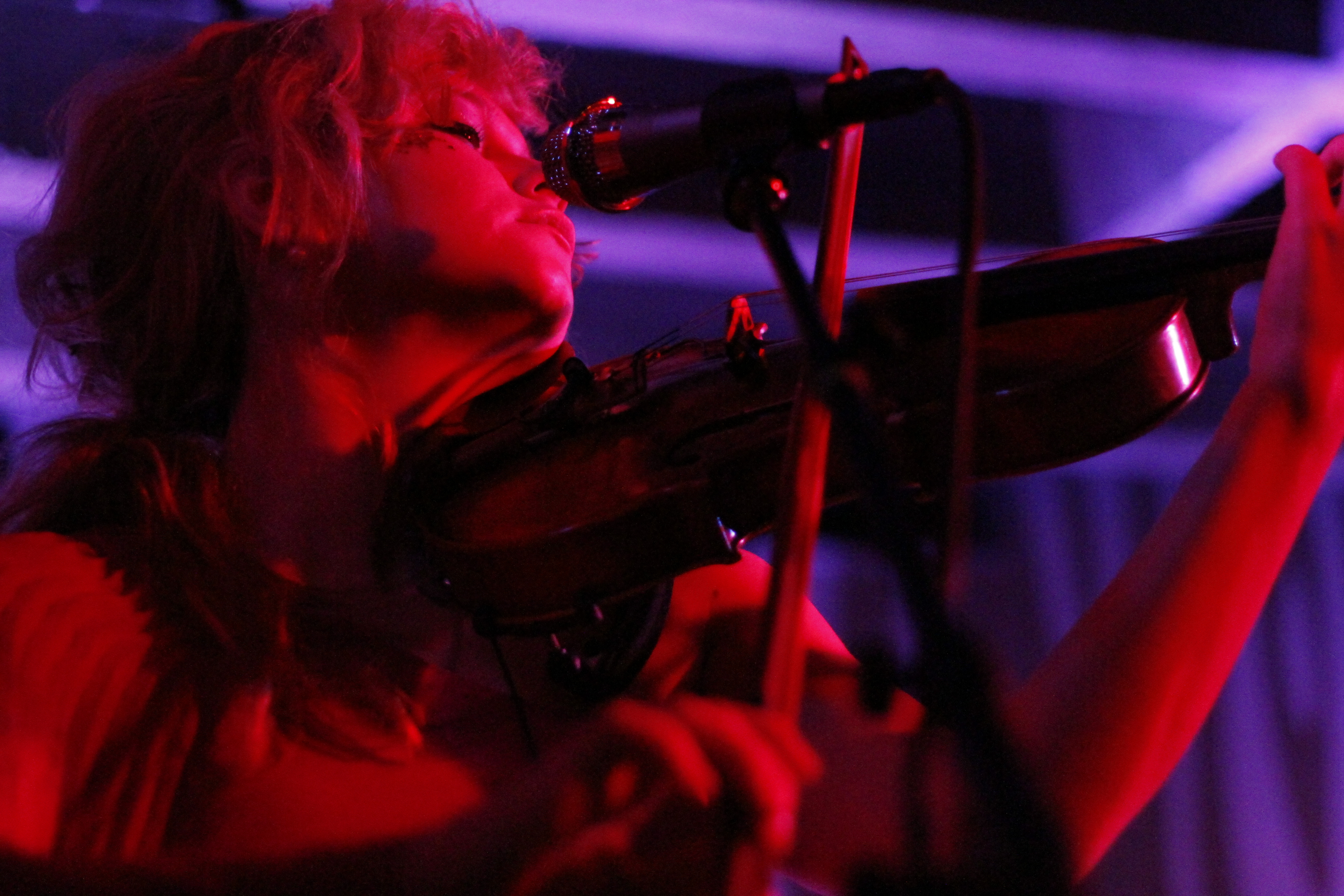
Jenavieve Varga on violin

All Alone in an Empty House was originally released on Trekky Records in 2008. The band signed to ANTI-Records on March 1, 2010 and their new label re-released the album on August 10 that year.

Reviewing the record, Bob Boilen of NPR said, "Take a pinch of the brilliance found in classical music and mix it with [Picker's] own. Lost in the Trees is orchestral folk where the "orchestral" part isn't an afterthought. This is mighty potent stuff." Keelan H. from Sputnik Music said, "Right from the swelling strings of six-minute opener “Empty House”, it’s clear that Lost in the Trees don’t take their “orchestral folk” label lightly."

Time Taunts Me was reissued by Trekky Records on February 4, 2011 with the addition of previously unreleased tracks.

=== A Church That Fits Our Needs ===
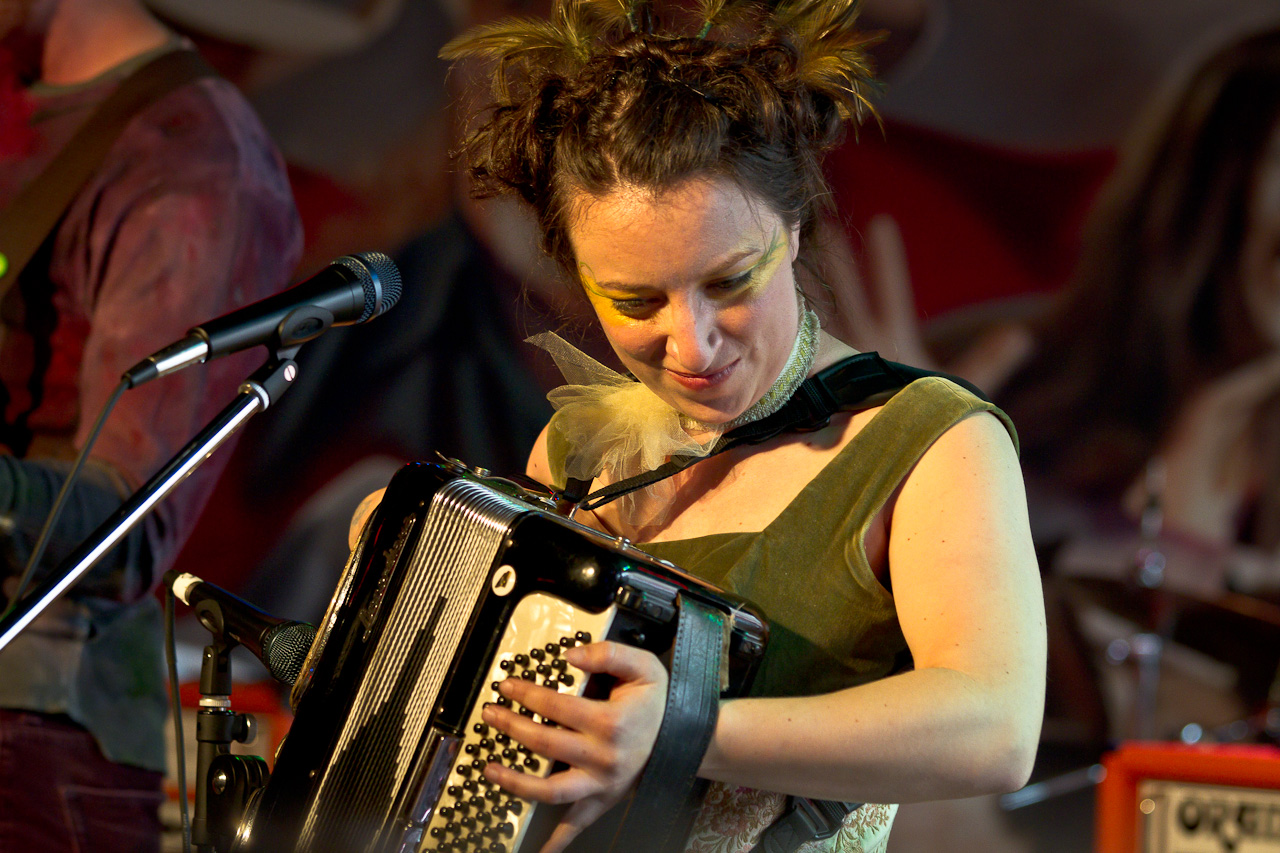
Emma Nadeau on accordion at SXSW Music Festival.

On March 20, 2012, ANTI-Records released A Church That Fits Our Needs, Lost in the Trees' second record with the label. Picker based the album largely on his mother's suicide in 2008, stating that "I wanted to give my mother a space to become all the things I think she deserved to be and wanted to be, and all the beautiful things in her that didn't quite shine while she was alive."

Rolling Stone said of the album, "Ari Picker tries to make sense of his mother's suicide against a backdrop of rich orchestration, piled generously atop a base of delicate acoustic folk like heaping spoonfuls of vanilla frosting." PopMatters said "A Church That Fits Our Needs bursts with the same melodic interplay that makes later Radiohead extraordinary."

A Church That Fits Our Needs peaked at number 9 on Billboard's Heatseeker's Albums.

== Discography ==
- 2007 - Time Taunts Me (EP)
- 2008 - All Alone in an Empty House (reissued 2010)
- 2012 - A Church That Fits Our Needs
- 2014 - Past Life (album)
- 2023 - I Was a Dreamer (single)
