= Will Hackney =

- Genres: Indie rock, folk
- Occupation(s): Musician, co-founder of Trekky Records
- Instrument(s): Vocals, mandolin, guitar, organ, bass, cornet, accordion
- Labels: Trekky

Will Hackney is an American musician and co-founder of Trekky Records. He has contributed to many North Carolina indie rock and folk bands, including Wye Oak, Lost in the Trees, Bowerbirds, Mount Moriah, and Loamlands. Hackney is a multi-instrumentalist, known for playing bass, mandolin, guitar, organ, cornet and many other instruments for his various projects. He co-founded Trekky Records in 2001 with Martin Anderson, later releasing records by artists including Sylvan Esso, Phil Cook, and Lost in the Trees.
