= Daniel Hart (musician) =

American musician and composer (born 1976)

- Born: Daniel Frederick Hart; August 1976 (age 50); Emporia, Kansas, U.S.
- Genres: Chamber pop; indie rock; indie; film score
- Occupations: Musician; composer
- Instruments: Vocals; guitar; violin
- Years active: 2002–present
- Labels: Milan; Lakeshore; Walt Disney Records; Bu Hanan Records; Trekky; Varese Sarabande
- Member of: Dark Rooms
- Formerly of: The Physics of Meaning

Daniel Frederick Hart is an American musician, composer and classically trained violinist. He has released music as a soloist and with his bands the Physics of Meaning and Dark Rooms. He has also toured and recorded with numerous bands, including St. Vincent, Other Lives, John Vanderslice, Swans, the Rosebuds, Annuals, Glasser, Broken Social Scene, Pattern Is Movement, Mount Moriah, the Polyphonic Spree and Sarah Jaffe. In 2012, he wrote and recorded the score for David Lowery's film Ain't Them Bodies Saints, which premiered at Sundance Film Festival in 2013. He wrote the scores for Pete's Dragon (2016), A Ghost Story (2017) and The Green Knight (2021). He lives in Los Angeles.

== Early life ==
Hart was born in Emporia, Kansas, where his parents worked as church musicians. He began playing the violin at age three. He graduated from Southern Methodist University's Meadows School of the Arts. After graduating college, he joined AmeriCorps and worked for a non-profit in New York City.

== Career ==
=== Music ===
Hart moved to North Carolina in 2002 and, along with David Karsten Daniels, John Ribo, Perry Wright and Alex Lazara, founded the Bu Hanan record label. He formed the band the Physics of Meaning, releasing two studio albums, and toured extensively with several bands. He played violin with the Polyphonic Spree, including opening for David Bowie in 2004. He was also a member of St. Vincent's band from 2007 through 2010, and contributing to the albums Marry Me, Actor, and Strange Mercy. He released his first solo record, The Orientalist, in 2011. In 2013, his new band, Dark Rooms, released their eponymous debut album. Hart also performed and recorded with the group Project Mastana, playing violin on their record Backroads to Bollywood.

=== Composing ===
In 2009, director David Lowery asked Hart to write two compositions for his first feature film, St. Nick. Since then, Hart has scored all of Lowery's films.

In 2012, Hart scored Lowery's breakout feature Ain't Them Bodies Saints, and Hart was subsequently named one of Filmmaker Magazine's "25 Faces of Independent Film" in 2013. The score mixes chamber orchestral arrangements of strings and horns with more traditional folk instruments, such as the banjo, mandolin, knee slaps and handclaps.

Following the release of Ain't Them Bodies Saints, Hart scored half a dozen independent feature films over the next two years, including Comet (2014), Return to Sender (2015), Uncertain (2015), and Lost in the Sun (2015), Tumbledown (2015), and The Girlfriend Game (2015).

Hart and Lowery next teamed up in 2016 for Disney's Pete's Dragon, an adaptation of the 1977 musical film of the same name. Hart's score was written for a 94-piece orchestra and 32-person choir, by far the largest ensemble for which Hart has written music. Hart composed the score in three months, working "seven days a week, eleven to twelve hours a day" to finish it in time.

Hart's next project was season one of Fox's TV series The Exorcist, which debuted on September 23, 2016, and is based on the William Peter Blatty novel of the same name.

In February 2017, Hart was nominated for IFMCA's Breakthrough Composer of the Year, for his work on Pete's Dragon and television series The Exorcist.

On March 28, 2017, Daniel Hart released his composition for the soundtrack to the podcast "S-Town".

== Discography ==
=== Studio albums ===
The Physics of Meaning

- The Physics of Meaning (2005)
- Snake Charmer and Destiny at the Stroke of Midnight (2008)

Solo

- The Orientalist (2011)

Dark Rooms

- Dark Rooms (2013)
- Distraction Sickness (2017)

Interview with the Vampire (Original Television Series Soundtrack)(2022)

Interview with the Vampire: Season 2 (Original Television Series Soundtrack)(2024)

The Vampire Lestat

- Butterscotch Bitch (2026)
- Your Biggest Fan (2026)
- The Long Face (2026)
- All Fall Down (2026)

== Filmography ==
=== Film ===
Year	Title	Notes
2009	St. Nick	Lead composer
2013	Ain't Them Bodies Saints	Composer
2014	Comet	Composer
2014	The Sideways Light	Composer
2015	Uncertain	Composer
2015	Return to Sender	Composer
2015	Lost in the Sun	Composer
2015	Tumbledown	Composer
2016	Half the Perfect World	Composer
2016	Pete's Dragon	Composer
2017	A Ghost Story	Composer (additional music provided by John Congleton)
2017	Heroin(e)	Composer
2018	The Old Man & the Gun	Composer
2019	Light of My Life	Composer
2021	The Green Knight	Composer
2023	Peter Pan & Wendy	Composer
2024	An Almost Christmas Story	Composer; short film
2026	Mother Mary	Composer
2026	Company	Composer

=== Television ===
Year	Title	Notes
2016	The Exorcist	Composer
2017	SMILF	Composer
2018	Strange Angel	Composer
2019	The Society	Composer
2022–present	Interview with the Vampire	Composer
2024	Sunny	Composer
