= Persistence of Memory (2008 novel) =

2008 novel by Amelia Atwater-Rhodes

- Author: Amelia Atwater-Rhodes
- Cover artist: Viktor Koen
- Language: English
- Series: Den of Shadows
- Genre: Gothic, Horror, Teen, Vampire
- Publisher: Delacorte Press, a division of Random House
- Publication date: December 9, 2008
- Publication place: United States
- Media type: Print (hardback & paperback)
- Pages: 212 pp (first edition hardcover)
- ISBN: 978-0-385-73437-0
- Preceded by: Wyvernhail
- Followed by: Token of Darkness

Persistence of Memory is the tenth novel by American teen author Amelia Atwater-Rhodes and is the fifth novel in her Den of Shadows series. Published on December 9, 2008 the novel tells the story of Erin Misrahe and her struggles with her alter-ego Shevaun, who is in fact a vampire with whom Erin has a link. The novel also mentions a character from Atwater-Rhodes's previous novel, In the Forests of the Night (1999), Alexander, the brother of the protagonist, Risika. The poem by Edgar Allan Poe entitled "A Dream Within a Dream" is featured in the novel.

== Summary ==
Erin Mishare is a sixteen-year-old girl who has an alter-ego named Shevaun. Erin has always struggled with this and has seen many therapists but none of them can figure out why Shevaun exists. The real Shevaun is a vampire on the other side of the world. When Erin gets stressed out, Shevaun is pulled away from her body and is switched into Erin's and vice versa, though neither is fully aware of it. When Shevaun starts realizing what is going on she sets out to kill Erin to break their connection. She, her boyfriend, and friends move to the city in which Erin lives, bringing them to the attention of the Triste witch line. Shevaun's boyfriend, Adjila, who is a Triste witch, confronts the head of his line, Pandora asking for her help to break the connection, but Adjila refuses the request.

Eventually, the two meet and the struggle to break their link continues inside Erin's head. It is also revealed that during the pregnancy of Erin's mother, Shevaun had accidentally injured her which nearly caused the death of both her and her mother. Racked with guilt at the possible death of an unborn child, Adjila uses Shevaun's healing ability as a vampire to save both the mother and the unborn Erin causing the two of them to be connected. The struggle to end the bond between Erin and Shevaun leaves Adjila unconscious and Erin on the verge of death. Pandora arrives to help revive Adjila so he can finish sorting out what he had created. Adjila with the help of Sassy, a hyena shapeshifter that Erin had befriended, save Erin, but because of the help from Sassy, this also turns Erin into a hyena shapeshifter. After all this, Erin has found a happiness among her new friends.
