= In the Forests of the Night =

Novel by Amelia Atwater-Rhodes

- 1999 Cover
- Author: Amelia Atwater-Rhodes
- Original title: White Wine
- Cover artist: Eric Dinyer
- Language: English
- Series: Den of Shadows
- Genre: Gothic, Horror, Vampire, Teen
- Publisher: Delacorte Press, a division of Random House
- Publication date: May 11, 1999
- Publication place: United States
- Media type: Print (Hardcover and Paperback)
- Pages: 147 pp (first edition hardcover)
- ISBN: 0-385-32674-2 (first edition hardcover)
- Followed by: Demon in My View (2000)

In the Forests of the Night is a vampire novel written by Amelia Atwater-Rhodes, and published in 1999. It was originally entitled White Wine. Atwater-Rhodes wrote it at the age of thirteen, but it was published on May 11, 1999, about a month after she turned fifteen. It is the first novel in the Den of Shadows series. It tells the story of a three-hundred-year-old vampire named Risika and her struggles throughout her life, both before and after she was turned into a vampire. The novel is told in first-person narrative by the protagonist, Risika. It was well-received by critics.

The title refers William Blake's poem "The Tyger", which appears at the beginning of the book.

Atwater-Rhodes' second book, Demon in My View, was published in 2000 when the author was 16 and is the sequel to In the Forests of the Night. Persistence of Memory, published in 2008, makes mention and features an appearance of the main character's brother.

== Writing process ==
According to Atwater-Rhodes' official site, The Den of Shadows, In the Forests of the Night is one of seven novels that she had finished writing and is the first she published. The inspiration for the novel came from an assignment she received in the seventh grade when her best friend Jessica had chosen "The Tyger" for the assignment. The character of Risika was taken from the brief mention in Atwater-Rhodes' unpublished novel, Red Wine. She began working on the novel in 1997, under the title White Wine. During the writing process, Atwater-Rhodes suffered from writer's block and a computer crash, causing her to lose most of her work on the novel, and thus resulted in some changes to the plotline. In the original manuscript, the character of Ather, an antagonist, was changed to Aubrey after the crash. She finished the novel in August of that year and spent the next four months revising the manuscript. She then sent the manuscript in December 1997 and by mid-February 1998 she met her agent, Tom Hart, who later called her and informed her that Random House would publish the novel on her fourteenth birthday; however, the novel was pushed back and released a little over a year later in May 1999.

== Release ==
In the Forests of the Night was first released in hardcover print on May 11, 1999, about a month after she signed her contract. It was later released in paperback in May, 2000. After the release of her Kiesha'ra Series, Atwater-Rhodes revealed that the first four novels she wrote, In the Forests of the Night, Demon in My View, Shattered Mirror and Midnight Predator, were part of the Den of Shadows series. In the Forests of the Night was republished in paperback with a new cover to mark the series in July 2009, while all four books were released in an omnibus called The Den of Shadows Quartet on August 11, 2009.

== Plot summary ==
The book is set in and around the author's home town of Concord, Massachusetts and in the realm of Nyeusigrube. The book centers around Risika who was born in 1684 as Rachel Weatere, a God-fearing seventeen-year-old who lived with her father, half-sister, Lynette, and her twin brother, Alexander. Alexander lives in fear as he believes he is of the Devil as he is able to hear people's thoughts and cause things to happen, including manipulating fire, causing him to inadvertently burn his sister Lynette. Aware of her twin brother's powers and his dislike for them, Rachel tries to do her best to comfort him. One day, an unknown stranger appears at their home, who is later revealed as Aubrey and gives Rachel a black rose, which pricks her finger, drawing blood. That night, Rachel hears her twin creep past her room and she follows him to find him confronting two vampires, Ather and Aubrey, who had come to transform Rachel against her will into a vampire to get back at Alexander for interfering with Ather when she tried to feed on Lynette. In an attempt to stop Ather from harming her brother, Rachel confronts Ather but Aubrey grabs her brother and drags him off, while exposing a knife. Rachel tries to go after them but Ather grabs her instead and begins her transformation into a vampire.

Three hundred years later, Rachel, now calling herself Risika, has a run-in with Aubrey after accidentally trespassing onto his territory in an attempt to feed, he leaves her another black rose and a note stating, "Stay in your place, Risika." Fearing Aubrey, but not letting it on, she burns the note and leaves it where Aubrey can find it, and does not visit the Bengal tiger which she has named Tora, in fear that Aubrey would use Tora to hurt her. Eventually Aubrey learns of Tora's existence and in an attempt to get Risika to lie low, he kills the tiger. Wounded once more, Risika takes on the tiger's stripes in her hair and finds a note with the name "Rachel" written on it and covered with tears. Enraged and thinking the note a joke, she calls out to whoever left the note but no one answers. She then takes off, transforming into a hawk, to confront Aubrey, and a fight breaks out between the two and Risika realizes she can defeat him and transforms herself into a Bengal tiger and pins Aubrey to the ground. In desperation and not wanting to die, Aubrey offers Risika his blood, which opens his mind to Risika. Accepting this, Risika transforms back to herself and takes Aubrey's blood but before allowing him to leave she takes the knife he carries, which she had found out nearly 300 years ago contains magic from one of the witch's clans, and slashes him in his collarbone, avenging the scar he had left on her not too long after she had been transformed and tells him to remember the events of that day and warns him that even though she has taken his blood it did not make up for the death of Tora or Alexander. After Aubrey leaves, Alexander reveals to Risika that he is still alive and that he was the one who had left her the note. He reveals that the reason Ather changed her was out of revenge against Alexander for having interrupting her trying feed on Lynette. Believing he could help his sister, Risika informs him that she is happy as she is and the story ends.

== Character list ==
Risika: The protagonist and narrator of the novel. Born as Rachel Waetere in 1684, she was transformed against her will into a vampire, when she was seventeen, by Ather in 1701 and lives in the fictional version of Concord, Massachusetts. The novel follows her journey three hundred years later as a vampire. She has a strong understanding and friendship with a Bengal tiger she named Tora. Risika can transform into a hawk, as she enjoys flying over the power of mental teleportation, which is most commonly used by other vampires. She has a long rivalry with her blood-brother, Aubrey. After her battle with Aubrey and taking his blood, she becomes stronger and is open to his mind. She also is able to transform into a second form, that of a Bengal tiger. Risika has golden blonde hair and gold eyes that went completely black after she was transformed but she later regained them after she transformed into the tiger. She also changed her hair to contain the strips of Tora, after the tiger was killed by Aubrey, so that Tora would be with her always. Her original hair and eye color were inherited from her mother. Atwater-Rhodes later revealed that Risika and her twin brother's mother was originally a witch of the Light Line.

Alexander: Twin brother to Rachel/Risika. The last of the Light Line and trained Triste witch, Alexander originally loathed his powers until a Triste witch by the name of Pandora heard him praying and explained to him what he truly is. Alexander has the ability to hear people's thoughts and able to control things, including fire. For the longest time it was unknown to Risika that he was not dead, prior to her contrary belief, though he was looking for her knowing that she was alive and that she was a vampire, and upon the death of Tora and saddened by his sister's lost he sent her a note which he had cried upon with her birthname written upon it. After Risika's battle with Aubrey he reveals himself to her.

Ather: The blood-mother of Aubrey and Risika. Ather is a vampire and a fledgling of the Silver Lines and after Risika's brother, Alexander, interrupts her feeding the high-priding vampire decides to change Rachel against her will to get back at Alexander. After Risika awakens, Ather takes Risika to the original Mayhem to make her feed. According to Risika, though she loathes her blood-mother for her transformation and will not defend her, she herself would never raise a hand to her or kill her.

Aubrey: The antagonist of the story and longtime rival, as well as blood-brother, to Risika. Aubrey despised Risika from day one and even tried to convince Ather not to change her into a vampire. Aubrey has been described as having a knife with him at all times that he had taken from a vampire hunter, the knife has magical qualities in the blade that, if it hits the target properly, can kill a vampire. Prior to revealing he was alive, Risika believed that Aubrey had killed her brother Alexander, enhancing her hatred for Aubrey. Aubrey presumably lives in New Mayhem and has territory in New York City. In 1701, he was sent as a deliverer of the black rose to Rachel.

Lynette: Half-sister of Rachel and Alexander. After the death of their biological mother, their father remarried and they bore Lynette. Her mother died shortly afterward.

Tora: A Bengal tiger that lives in an unnamed zoo in New York. Risika has a close bond with the tiger and cares about her deeply. According to Risika, the two have a strong understanding of each other and they keep each other company. Tora is later killed by Aubrey, to hurt Risika. When Risika had discovered the body she noticed Aubrey had tied the tiger up before stabbing her with a knife.

== Background ==
On December 8, 2009, a little over ten years after In the Forests of the Night was published, Atwater-Rhodes revealed background information about the characters and their world on her official site. She revealed that Risika, as well as Aubrey and Ather, are part of a line of vampires called the Silver Line; their mother was known as Lila Light who originally resided in an unknown place that was taken over by the vampires who ran the empire of Midnight. Before it was taken over, she had fled to a town called Vieton where she met and married Rachel and Alexander's father. Before their birth, a vampire by the name of Kaleo had taken an interest in Lila and courted her for three years. After they were born Lila feared for her children's lives as Kaleo grew impatient waiting on her and feared he would kill them. To protect her children, she allowed him to transform her into a vampire and she changed her name to Charcoal. Because of his wife's unexplained disappearance, Rachel and Alexander's father left Vieton and took them to be raised in the town in which they had grown up before Rachel was transformed into a vampire, as well as protect them from Midnight. To explain their mother's disappearance their father told them she had died giving birth to them. When Risika had visited Mayhem after her transformation her mother saw her and knew what she had become and using her Light Line magic out of anger, she set Mayhem a-blaze, as fire is the specialty of those in the Light Line. Lila Light, although unknown to Risika that Charcoal is her mother, currently resides in New Mayhem.

== Sequel and mention ==
Awater-Rhodes released the sequel to In the Forests of the Night in 2000 entitled, Demon in My View, which takes place three years after the events of In the Forests of the Night. In the Forests of the Night is also mentioned in Demon in My View under the fictional title, Tiger, Tiger. Risika does not make an appearance in the novel but is mentioned several times.

Alexander makes an appearance in the novel, Persistence of Memory although Risika does not. It is mentioned that there is an issue going on between Risika and Alexander during the events of the novel.

== Reviews and acknowledgement ==
In the Forests of the Night was applauded as "Insightful...and imaginative" by Publishers Weekly and "remarkable" by Voice of Youth Advocates. San Diego Union-Tribune called the novel "An impressive debut". School Library Journal praised it stating "This first novel by an author with great ability and promise is sure to be popular." Booklist stated that because of Atwater-Rhodes being only fourteen at that time she published the novel and because of it content that the novel "may encourage other young writers to pursue the craft." The Houston Chronicle called the novel "an easy-to-read page-turner." The novel is an ALA Quick Pick for Young Adults.
