= Snakecharm =

Novel by Amelia Atwater-Rhodes

- 2004 cover
- Author: Amelia Atwater-Rhodes
- Cover artist: Cliff Nielsen
- Language: English
- Series: The Kiesha'ra Series
- Genre: Fantasy novel
- Publisher: Delacorte Press
- Publication date: September 2004
- Publication place: United States
- Media type: Print (Hardback, Paperback)
- Pages: 167 pp (hardcover first printing)
- ISBN: 0-385-73072-1
- Preceded by: Hawksong
- Followed by: Falcondance

Snakecharm is the second book in The Kiesha'ra Series by American author Amelia Atwater-Rhodes, published September 28, 2004, by Delacorte Books. It is narrated by Zane Cobriana, Diente of the serpiente people and alistair to Danica Shardae, Tuuli Thea of the avians. This book relates what happens after Zane and Danica's marriage ends the avian-serpiente war.

== Plot summary ==
Danica has begun to fit into serpiente society more and more, but other people do not have her courage or motivation. The avians and the serpiente, in spite of the royal union, are hardly warming up to each other. Neither of the sides is willing to try to join the other. Stirring things up is Syfka, a powerful aplomado falcon who has just arrived to drag a falcon criminal back to the island of Ahnmik.

Syfka has absolutely no respect for the reunification of the two cultures and with her falcon magic, she has no problem with trying to destroy the fragile peace. There is little that Zane and Danica can do to try to stop her, considering her ability to use powerful magics almost casually and the fact that she is several thousands of years old. On top of that the avians and serpiente are nowhere near capable of defending themselves against the falcon empire. It seems best to just hand Syfka her criminal and make sure she feels no need to come back. But Rei, the leader of the Royal Flight and the man who Danica loved before she met Zane, becomes increasingly agitated during Syfka's search and the question arises of what would happen if the "criminal" turned out to be someone loyal to Zane and Danica. After hearing a young woman's stories about her experiences on the falcon island, Zane and Danica are forced to wonder whether they can hand someone over to the falcons with a healthy conscience.

The situation is complicated by Danica's pregnancy. Neither the serpiente nor the avians are pleased with the idea of a mixed-blood child taking the throne. A child of a cobra and another serpent is always a cobra, a child of a hawk and another avian is always a hawk. But a cobra-hawk child has co-dominant genes and as a mixture between the two, it would end both royal lines. Both sides are worried about being dominated by the other and both are putting pressure on Zane and Danica to raise the child in their tradition.

== Sequel ==
The sequel to Snakecharm is Falcondance, which was released in 2005.
