= Vampire literature =

Conjectural literary genre

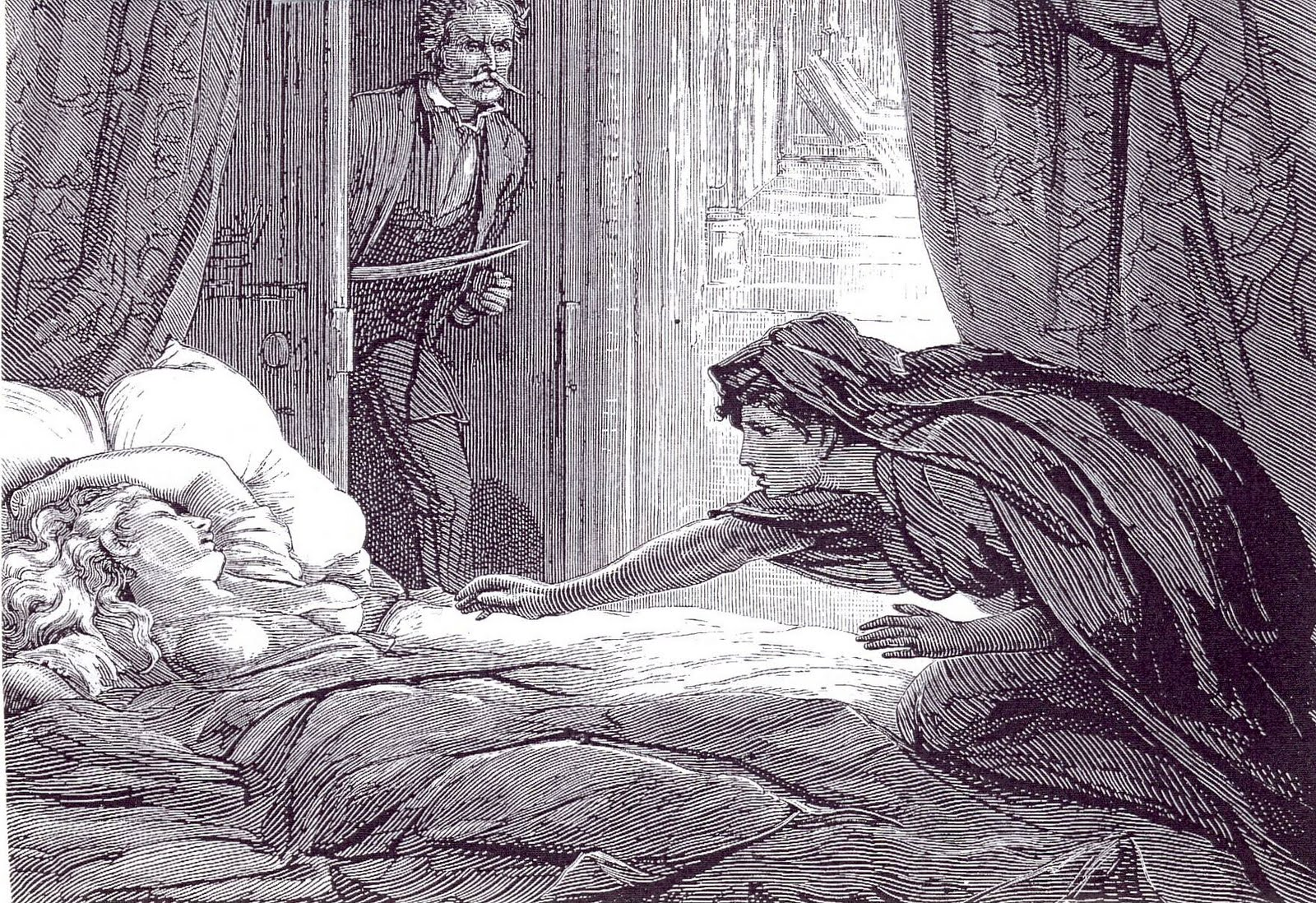
Artwork based on Sheridan Le Fanu's Carmilla, an early and influential work of vampire literature.

Vampire literature covers the spectrum of literary work concerned principally with the subject of vampires. The literary vampire first appeared in 18th-century poetry, before becoming one of the stock figures of gothic fiction with the publication of Polidori's The Vampyre (1819), inspired by a story told to him by Lord Byron. Later influential works include The Family of the Vourdalak (1839) by Aleksey Konstantinovich Tolstoy; the penny dreadful Varney the Vampire (1847); Sheridan Le Fanu's tale of a lesbian vampire Carmilla (1872), and Bram Stoker's Dracula (1897). Some authors created a more "sympathetic vampire", with Varney being the first, and more recent examples such as Moto Hagio's series The Poe Clan (1972–1976) and Anne Rice's novel Interview with the Vampire (1976) proving influential.

== History ==
=== 18th century ===
Vampire fiction is rooted in the "vampire craze" between the 1720s and 1730s, which culminated in the official exhumations of the suspected vampires Petar Blagojevich and Arnold Paole in Serbia under the Habsburg monarchy.

Heinrich August Ossenfelder is attributed with introducing the theme of vampires into creative literature with the short German poem The Vampire (Der vampir) in 1748. The poem was written as a commission for the scientific journal The Natural Scientist (Der Naturforscher) to accompany an article about vampire reports. The poem has strong erotic overtones: a man whose love is rejected by a respectable and pious maiden threatens to pay her a nightly visit, drink her blood by giving her the seductive kiss of the vampire and thus prove to her that his teaching is better than her mother's Christianity.

There have been a number of tales about a dead person returning from the grave to visit his/her beloved or spouse and bring them death in a way or another, the narrative poem Lenore (1773) by Gottfried August Bürger being an example (though the apparently returned lover is actually revealed to be death himself in disguise). One of its lines, Denn die Todten reiten schnell ("For the dead ride fast"), was to be quoted in Bram Stoker's classic Dracula. A later German poem exploring the same subject with a prominent vampiric element was The Bride of Corinth (1797) by Goethe, a story about a young woman who returns from the grave to seek her betrothed:

From my grave to wander I am forced
Still to seek the God's long sever'd link,
Still to love the bridegroom I have lost,
And the lifeblood of his heart to drink.

=== 19th century ===
The first mention of vampires in English literature appears in Robert Southey's monumental oriental epic poem Thalaba the Destroyer (1801), where the main character Thalaba's deceased beloved Oneiza turns into a vampire, although that occurrence is actually marginal to the story. It has been argued that Samuel Taylor Coleridge's poem Christabel (written between 1797 and 1801, but not published until 1816) has influenced the development of vampire fiction: the heroine Christabel is seduced by a female supernatural being called Geraldine who tricks her way into her residence. Though Coleridge never finished the poem, some argue that his intended plot had Geraldine eventually trying to marry Christabel after having assumed the appearance of Christabel's absent lover. The story bears a remarkable resemblance to the overtly vampiric story of Carmilla by Joseph Sheridan Le Fanu (1872).

In a passage in his epic poem The Giaour (1813), Lord Byron alludes to the traditional folkloric conception of the vampire as a being damned to suck the blood and destroy the life of its nearest relations:

But first, on earth as vampire sent,
Thy corpse shall from its tomb be rent:
Then ghostly haunt thy native place,
And suck the blood of all thy race;

There from thy daughter, sister, wife,
At midnight drain the stream of life;
Yet loathe the banquet which perforce
Must feed thy livid living corpse:
Thy victims ere they yet expire
Shall know thy demon for their sire,
As cursing thee, thou cursing them,
Thy flowers are withered on the stem.

Byron also composed an enigmatic fragmentary story, published as "A Fragment" in 1819 as part of the Mazeppa collection, concerning the mysterious fate of an aristocrat named Augustus Darvell whilst journeying in the Orient—as his contribution to the famous ghost story competition at the Villa Diodati by Lake Geneva in the summer of 1816, between him, Percy Bysshe Shelley, Mary Shelley and John William Polidori (who was Byron's personal physician). This story provided the basis for The Vampyre (1819) by Polidori. Byron's own wild life became the model for Polidori's undead protagonist Lord Ruthven. According to A. Asbjorn Jon, "the choice of name [for Polidori's Lord Ruthven] is presumably linked to Lady Caroline Lamb's earlier novel Glenarvon, where it was used for a rather ill disguised Byronesque character".

An unauthorized sequel to Polidori's tale by Cyprien Bérard called Lord Ruthwen ou les Vampires (1820) was attributed to Charles Nodier. Nodier himself adapted "The Vampyre" into the first vampire stage melodrama, Le Vampire. Unlike Polidori's original story, Nodier's play was set in Scotland. This, in turn, was adapted by the English melodramatist James Planché as The Vampire; or, the Bride of the Isles (1820) at the Lyceum (then called the English Opera House), also set in Scotland. Planché introduced the "vampire trap" as a way for the title fiend to appear in a dream at the beginning and then to vanish into the earth at his destruction. Nodier's play was also the basis of an opera called Der Vampyr by the German composer Heinrich Marschner, who set the story in a more plausible Wallachia. Planché, in turn, translated the libretto of this opera into English in 1827, where it was performed at the Lyceum also. Alexandre Dumas, père later redramatized the story in a play also entitled Le Vampire (1851). Another theatrical vampire of this period was "Sir Alan Raby", who is the lead character of The Vampire (1852), a play by Dion Boucicault. Boucicault himself played the lead role to great effect, though the play itself had mixed reviews. Queen Victoria, who saw the play, described it in her diary as "very trashy".

An important later example of 19th-century vampire fiction is the penny dreadful epic Varney the Vampire (1847), featuring Sir Francis Varney as the vampire. In this story, we have the first example of the standard trope in which the vampire comes through the window at night and attacks a maiden as she lies sleeping. Alexandre Dumas' 1849 novella The Pale Lady features the first Carpathian vampire nobleman, a young Moldavian noble and outlaw named Kostaki. Kostaki is a descendant of the Wallachian Brancoveanu family, can hypnotise, and he sneaks into a maiden's chamber to make her follow him into his tomb. His bite can kill and turn a victim into a vampire within 15 days, unless that person washes the bite wounds with his vampire blood. Heathcliff in Emily Brontë's Wuthering Heights (1847) is suspected of being a vampire by his housekeeper at one point, which he immediately laughs off as "absurd nonsense".

Fascinating erotic fixations are evident in Sheridan Le Fanu's classic novella Carmilla (1872), which features a female vampire with lesbian inclinations who seduces the heroine Laura while draining her of her vital fluids. Le Fanu's story is set in the Duchy of Styria. Such central European locations became a standard feature of vampire fiction.

Another important example of the development of vampire fiction can be found in three seminal novels by Paul Féval: Le Chevalier Ténèbre (1860), La Vampire (1865) and La Ville Vampire (1874). Marie Nizet's Le Capitaine Vampire (1879) features a Russian officer, Boris Liatoukine, who is a vampire, embodying Russian imperialism in 1877 Romania.

In German literature, one of the most popular novels was Hans Wachenhusen's Der Vampyr – Novelle aus Bulgarien (1878), which, on account of the author's first-hand experience of Ottoman society, includes a detailed description of the multicultural society of Bulgaria, and which contains an atmosphere that is "in some parts comparable to Dracula".

The most famous Serbian vampire was Sava Savanović, from a folklore-inspired novel, Ninety Years Later, by Milovan Glišić, first published in 1880. Serbian vampires—albeit depicted first in French (1839) and then Russian (1884)—also appear in Count Tolstoy's novella The Family of the Vourdalak.

Karl Heinrich Ulrichs published the short story "Manor" in 1885, about two sailors and lovers. When the older of the two, Manor, drowns at sea he returns to his lover Har each night to suck his blood and lay together.

==== Dracula ====
Bram Stoker's Dracula (1897) has been the definitive description of the vampire in popular fiction for the last century. Its portrayal of vampirism as a disease (contagious demonic possession), with its undertones of sex, blood, and death, struck a chord in a Victorian Britain where tuberculosis and syphilis were common.

Although it has been claimed that the character of Count Dracula is based upon Vlad Draculesti III (Vlad the Impaler), also known as Vlad Ţepeş', a notorious 15th-century Wallachian (Romanian) warlord, or Voivode, this has been debunked by multiple scholars. Unlike the historical personage, however, Stoker located his Count Dracula in a castle near the Borgo Pass in Transylvania, and ascribed to that area the supernatural aura it retains to this day in the popular imagination.

Stoker likely drew inspiration from Irish myths of blood-sucking creatures. He was also influenced by Le Fanu's Carmilla. Le Fanu was Stoker's editor when Stoker was a theater critic in Dublin, Ireland. Like Le Fanu, Stoker created compelling female vampire characters such as Lucy Westenra and the Brides of Dracula.

Stoker's vampire hunter Abraham Van Helsing was a strong influence on subsequent vampire literature.

=== 20th century ===
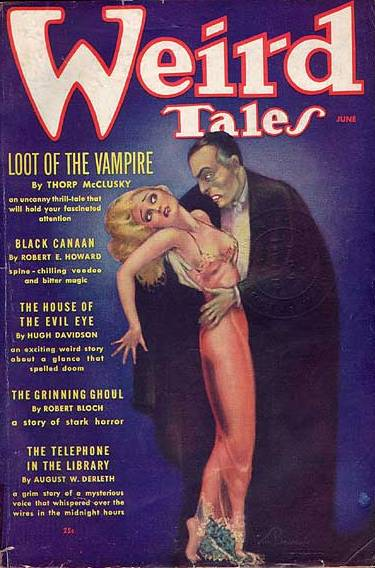
Vampires appeared commonly in 20th-century literature, such as in this 1936 issue of Weird Tales.

Though Stoker's Count Dracula remained an iconic figure, especially in the new medium of cinema, as in the film Nosferatu (1922), 20th-century vampire fiction went beyond traditional Gothic horror and explored new genres such as science fiction. An early example of this is Gustave Le Rouge's Le prisonnier de la planète Mars (1908) and its sequel La guerre des vampires (1909), in which a native race of bat-winged, blood-drinking humanoids is found on Mars. In the 1920 novella La Jeune Vampire (The Young Vampire), by J.-H. Rosny aîné, vampirism is explained as a form of possession by souls originating in another universe known simply as the Beyond.

Possibly the most influential example of modern vampire science fiction is Richard Matheson's I Am Legend (1954). The novel is set in a future Los Angeles overrun with undead cannibalistic/bloodsucking beings. The protagonist is the sole survivor of a pandemic of a bacterium that causes vampirism. He must fight to survive attacks from the hordes of nocturnal creatures, discover the secrets of their biology, and develop effective countermeasures. The novel was adapted into three movies: The Last Man on Earth starring Vincent Price in 1964, The Omega Man starring Charlton Heston in 1971, and I Am Legend starring Will Smith in 2007.

The latter part of the 20th century saw the rise of multi-volume vampire epics. The first of these was Gothic romance writer Marilyn Ross's Barnabas Collins series (1966–71) loosely based on the contemporary American TV soap opera Dark Shadows. It also set the trend for seeing vampires as poetic, tragic heroes rather than as the traditional embodiment of evil. This formula was followed in the popular Vampire Chronicles (1976-2018) series of novels by Anne Rice and Chelsea Quinn Yarbro's massive Saint-Germain series (1978–). Ross, Rice and Yarbro set the trend for multi-volume vampire sagas which are now a stock feature of mass-market fiction (see below for list). Rice's work also saw the beginning of the convergence of traditional Gothic ideas with the modern Gothic subculture and a more explicit exploration of the transgressive sexualities which had always been implicit in vampire fiction.

Stephen King, while not a writer of multi-volume epics on vampires, has become a very influential horror writer of the late 20th and early 21st century, evidenced by the nearly sixty books he has published over the past 50 years selling around the world in multiple languages. King's repertoire often hybridizes traditional vampire folklore with the coy charm inspired by Bela Lugosi's performance while increasing the physical violence, carnage, and overall butchery. His work describes very graphically in detail the ruthlessness of what essentially is a supernatural, parasitic predator that unleashes itself and intrudes on ordinary life for ordinary people, a recurring theme of his books. According to King himself, he was still a teacher at a high school when one of the books the class was studying was Bram Stoker's Dracula. Over dinner, he asked his wife, Tabitha, what would happen if Dracula came back in the 20th century. "He'd probably be run over by a Yellow Cab on Park Avenue and killed," his wife replied, and it was from there that she suggested a different, rural setting.

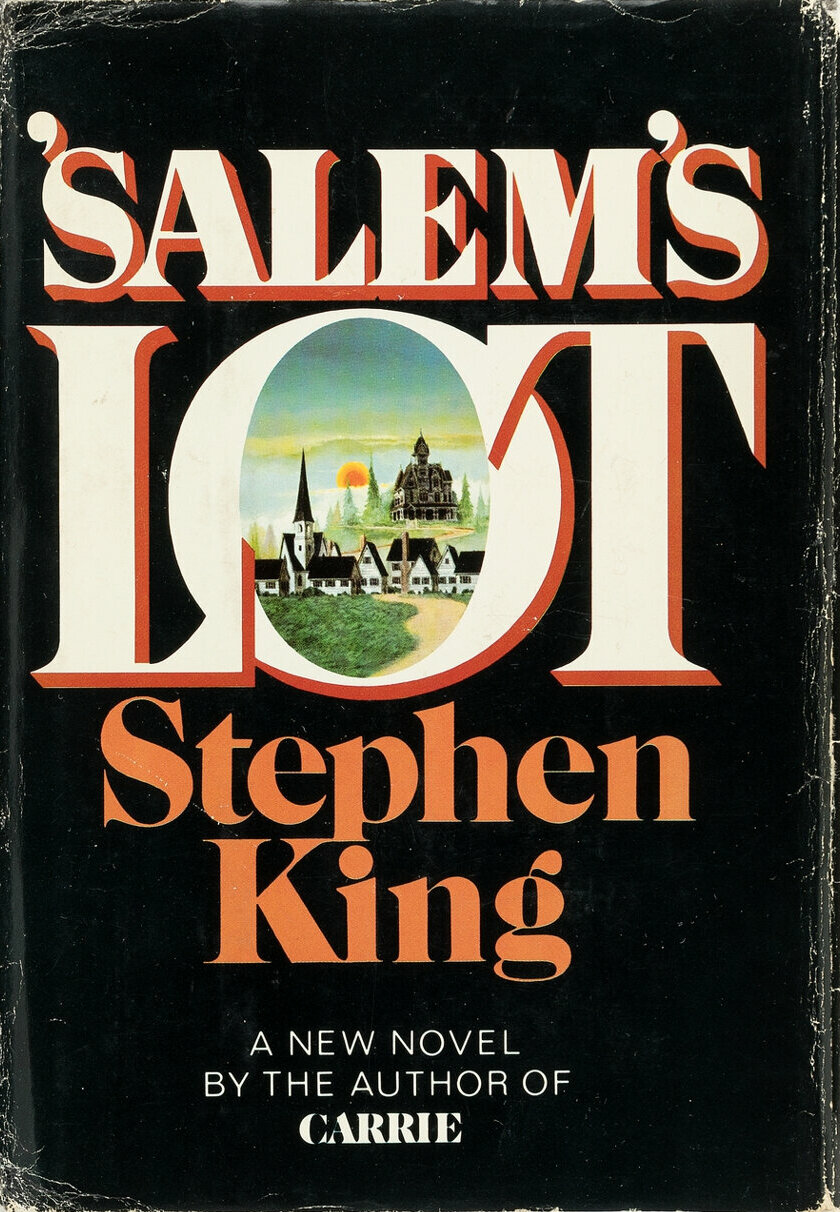
First edition book cover of 'Salem's Lot (1975), a vampire tale by Stephen King

Salem's Lot, the book that resulted from that conversation, was published in 1975 as the follow-up to Carrie; as of 2022, the process of weaving vampires into his stories is ongoing. King's overall body of work spans the late 20th and early 21st centuries and Salem's Lot has over the years become one of his most important works. The title references a Maine town called Jerusalem's Lot and it is the centerpiece of two full novels and one short story, plus twelve other books that reference the town's existence within the multiverse that runs through all Stephen King books. King acknowledged the influence of Dracula on the work, as well as the violent, pre-Comics Code vampires portrayed in horror comics such as those released by E.C. Comics. King also has written several other works with vampires included in them in both long and short form including The Little Sisters of Elluria (1998), "The Nightflier" (1993, in Nightmares and Dreamscapes), and several books in his series The Dark Tower (1982-2012) which also contains at least one character from Salem's Lot. Many of these have been brought to film and television as well as comic books.

The 1981 novel The Hunger (adapted as a film in 1983) continued the theme of open sexuality and examined the biology of vampires, suggesting that their special abilities were the result of physical properties of their blood. The novel suggested that not all vampires were undead humans, but some were a separate species that had evolved alongside humans. This interpretation of vampires has since then been used in several science-fiction stories dealing with vampires, most famously the Blade movie series. The 1982 novel Fevre Dream by notable author George R. R. Martin tells the tale of a race of living vampires, extremely human-like but obligate predators on humans, set in the Mississippi Riverboat era, where one of them has developed a dietary supplement to "cure" them, and is fighting for the right and opportunity to distribute it.

Kim Newman's Anno Dracula series (1992–) returns to Stoker's Count Dracula, looking at an alternate world where Dracula defeated Van Helsing's group and conquered Britain, and gives the genre a somewhat postmodern spin. The television series Buffy the Vampire Slayer, created and largely written by Joss Whedon, also explored vampire folklore in the light of postmodern and feminist theory, defining the 'condition' as humans who were made to drink vampire blood after the vampire drinks from them, with turned vampires being essentially demons possessing human corpses; Buffy and its spin-off, Angel, also feature the character of Angel in a prominent role, with Angel being a vampire who was cursed with his soul, restoring his capacity for compassion, but also forcing him to live with the guilt of what he did as a regular vampire.

Post-Colonial perspectives on the vampire legend are provided in Nalo Hopkinson's novel Brown Girl in the Ring (1998), which features the Soucouyant, a vampire of Caribbean folklore, and in Tananarive Due's My Soul to Keep (1995) and its sequel The Living Blood (2001).

In 1989, a comprehensive bibliography of vampire literature was published – Margaret L. Carter's The Vampire in Literature. A Critical Bibliography (Ann Arbor, Michigan, U.S.: Umi Research Press).

One of the best-known stories of Nobel Prize winning Israeli writer Shmuel Yosef Agnon is "The Lady and the Peddler" (האדונית והרוכל). It tells of Yosef the Peddler who wanders a great East European forest and encounters a lonely house inhabited by a mysterious lady named Helen. First finding refuge there from a pouring rain, he is eventually seduced to stay and enter into a sexual relationship. Eventually, however, he discovers that she is in the habit of killing her husbands, devouring them and drinking their blood, which keeps her young and beautiful, and that she had done it to 17 men before him. She also tries to kill Yosef but fails, wounds herself and eventually dies. She is then eaten by birds while Yosef the Peddler picks up his pack and resumes his wanderings.

=== 21st century ===
Many books based on vampires are still being published, including several continuing series. Paranormal romance, inspired by Anne Rice, but mostly dropping the open sexuality of her characters in favor of more conventional sexual roles, is a remarkable contemporary publishing phenomenon. Romances with handsome vampires as the male lead include Lynsay Sands' Argeneau family series (2003–), Charlaine Harris The Southern Vampire Mysteries series (2001–2013), and Christine Feehan's Carpathian series (1999–). However, Laurell K. Hamilton's Anita Blake: Vampire Hunter series has again shifted the genre boundaries from romance back toward the territory of erotica.

The occult detective subgenre is represented by Jim Butcher's The Dresden Files fantasy series (2000–), and Charlaine Harris's The Southern Vampire Mysteries (2001–2013).

In the field of juvenile and young adult literature, Darren Shan wrote a 12-book series (The Saga of Darren Shan) about a boy who becomes a vampire's assistant, beginning with Cirque Du Freak (2000) and ending with Sons of Destiny (2006). A film adaptation has been made of the first three books called Cirque du Freak: The Vampire's Assistant (2009). He is also currently writing a prequel to the Saga, a series of four books all about Larten Crepsley (one of the main characters) starting with Birth of a Killer (2010) and finishing with Brothers to the Death (2012). Ellen Schreiber created a young adult series about Raven Madison and her vampire boyfriend Alexander Sterling, starting with Vampire Kisses (2005). In Scott Westerfeld's young adult novel Peeps (2005), the protagonist carries a contagious parasite that causes vampire-like behavior.

Count Dracula also continues to inspire novelists, for example Elizabeth Kostova in The Historian (2005).

Swedish author John Ajvide Lindqvist's critically praised vampire story Låt den rätte komma in (2004), about the relationship of a 12-year-old boy with a 200-year-old vampire child, has now been translated into English as Let the Right One In (2008) and a film adaptation has been produced. The story takes place in Blackeberg, a suburb of Stockholm. This particular novel does not follow the modern romantic trend, and instead focuses on a human-vampire friendship. Crucially, it retains many of the vampire traits popularized by Dracula.

Dimitris Lyacos's second book of the Poena Damni trilogy With the People from the Bridge handles the vampire legend in the context of a ritualistic post-theatrical drama performance. In a dystopian setting, under the arches of a derelict bridge, a group of social outcasts present an unconventional, non-Gothic version of a vampire drawing from ancient Greek religion and literature, Christian eschatology as well as traveler reports of vampire epidemics in the Balcans. The story is recounted in a minimalist style that makes no explicit mention to vampires, the undead, graves or the Underworld, conveying, nevertheless, the underlying theme unambiguously and in striking physical detail.

Peter Watts' novel Blindsight has explored a scientific basis for vampires, depicting them as an evolutionary offshoot from humanity who were not the dominant species on the planet solely due to an evolutionary glitch making them averse to Euclidean geometry (right angles cause seizures in what is called "Crucifix Glitch", leading to them dying out when modern technology with all its structures swept the world). Implied to have vastly superior intelligence and problem-solving capabilities, they were recreated from gene snippets for special tasks, with special drugs alleviating their crucifix glitch. One particularly important vampire trait is their ability to hibernate for extended periods of time, which makes cryogenic stasis possible and is applied to astronauts via gene-therapy. At the end of the novel it is implied the vampires have taken control of earth and may be exterminating baseline humanity.

In recent years, vampire fiction has been one of many supernatural fiction genres used in the creation of mashups. These works combine either a pre-existing text or a historic figure with elements of genre fiction. One of the best-known of these works is Abraham Lincoln, Vampire Hunter by Seth Grahame-Smith, in which the historic Abraham Lincoln has a fictional secret identity as a hunter of evil vampires.

The 21st century brought more examples of vampire fiction, such as J. R. Ward's Black Dagger Brotherhood series, and other popular vampire books which appeal to teenagers and young adults. Such vampiric paranormal romance novels and allied vampiric chick-lit and vampiric occult detective stories are an exceedingly popular contemporary publishing phenomenon. L. A. Banks' The Vampire Huntress Legend Series, Laurell K. Hamilton's erotic Anita Blake: Vampire Hunter series, and Kim Harrison's The Hollows series, portray the vampire in a variety of new perspectives, some of them unrelated to the original legends. Vampires in the Twilight series (2005–2008) by Stephenie Meyer ignore the effects of garlic and crosses and are not harmed by sunlight, although it does reveal their supernatural status. Richelle Mead further deviates from traditional vampires in her Vampire Academy series (2007–2010), basing the novels on Romanian lore with two races of vampires, one good and one evil, as well as half-vampires.

In recent years, there has been more vampire fiction that discusses more political issues. These political issues usually revolve around gender and sexuality. This was first seen with Fanu's Carmilla in 1872. Today, female vampires represent womanhood and the tension of cultural norms. Especially when it comes to sexuality. These ideas are explored in new novels such as, Kat Dunn's Hungerstone (2020) and Woman Eating by Claire Kohda. Hungerstone is a contemporary novel retelling that of Carmilla. It explores sapphic relationships, while also discussing womanhood in desire. While, Women Eating, discusses the need of desire and acceptance in society through the appetite of a vampire. Through speculative fiction, like fantasy or science fiction, political topics can be discussed in metaphors. Especially for gender and sexuality topics. Vampire fiction has been a great example of this, that is still relevant today.

== Traits of vampires in fiction ==
The traits of the literary vampire have evolved from the often repulsive figures of folklore. Fictional vampires can be romantic figures, often described as elegant and sexy (compare demons such as succubi and incubi). This is in stark contrast to the vampire of Eastern European folklore, which was a horrifying animated corpse. However, as in folklore, the literary vampire is sustained by drinking blood. They do not need other food, water, or even oxygen. They are sometimes portrayed as being unable to eat human food at all, forcing them to either avoid public dining or mime chewing and eating to deceive their mortal victims. The fictional vampire, however, often has a pale appearance rather than the dark or ruddy skin of folkloric vampires and their skin is cool to the touch. As in folklore, literary vampires can usually be warded off with garlic and symbols of the Christian faith, such as holy water, a crucifix, or a rosary.

According to literary scholar Nina Auerbach in Our Vampires, Ourselves, the influence of the moon was seen as dominant in the earliest examples of vampire literature:

For at least fifty years after Planche's Vampire, the moon was the central ingredient of vampire iconography; vampire's solitary and repetitive lives consisted of incessant deaths and – when the moon shone down on them – quivering rebirths. Ruthven, Varney and Raby need marriage and blood to replenish their vitality but they turn for renewed life to the moon...a corpse quivering to life under the moon's rays is the central image of midcentury vampire literature; fangs, penetration, sucking and staking are all peripheral to its lunar obsession.

Bram Stoker's Dracula was hugely influential in its depiction of vampire traits, some of which are described by the novel's vampire expert Abraham Van Helsing. Dracula has the ability to change his shape at will, his featured forms in the novel being that of a wolf, bat, mist and fog. He can also crawl up and down the vertical external walls of his castle in the manner of a lizard. One very famous trait that Stoker added is the inability to be seen in mirrors, which is not found in traditional Eastern European folklore, as Stoker combined the folklore of Jiangshi being terrified of their own reflection with the material fact of the silver backed mirrors of the time. Dracula also had protruding teeth, though was preceded in this by Varney the Vampire and Carmilla. In Anne Rice's books, the vampires appear their best self of the age they were turned into a vampire; for instance, when Claudia was turned into a vampire, her golden curls became tight and voluminous, her skin turns a pale but smooth and clear, and rids her of the rotting disease. But it also seems like a curse as she retains her child-body for her entire vampire lifetime and any modifications on her body, such as even cutting her hair, grows it back to the same length as it was before. A similar occurrence can be observed in the Twilight series - when Bella is turned into a vampire, her wounds heal, hair becomes healthy and shiny, her broken back and ribs get mended, the color comes back to her skin, and her sunken eyes, cheeks and skinny body return to a healthy state; in fact she is brought back to life from the brink of death by turning her into a vampire.

In the Dracula novel, the vampire hunter Van Helsing prescribes that a vampire be destroyed by a wooden stake (preferably made of white oak) through the heart, decapitation, drowning, or incineration. The vampire's head must be removed from its body, the mouth stuffed with garlic and holy water or relics, the body drawn and quartered, then burned and spread into the four winds, with the head buried on hallowed ground. The destruction of the vampire Lucy follows the three-part process enjoined by Van Helsing (staking, decapitation, and garlic in the mouth).

Traditional vampire folklore, followed by Stoker in Dracula, does not usually hold that sunlight is fatal to vampires, though they are nocturnal. It is also notable in the novel that Dracula can walk about in the daylight, in bright sunshine, though apparently in discomfort and without the ability to use most of his powers, like turning into mist or a bat. He is still strong and fast enough to struggle with and escape from most of his male pursuers. Fatal exposure to sunlight of a vampire in their coffin dates at least as far back as The Story Of Yand Manor House (1898) by E. and H. Heron; such scenes in vampire films however, most especially 1922's Nosferatu and the closing scene of the 1958 film Dracula in which Count Dracula is burnt by the sun, were very influential on later vampire fiction. For instance, Anne Rice's vampire Lestat and Chelsea Quinn Yarbro's Count Saint-Germain both avoid the lethal effects of daylight by staying closeted indoors during the day.

A well-known set of special powers and weaknesses is commonly associated with vampires in contemporary fiction. There is a tendency, however, for authors to pick and choose the ones they like, or find more realistic ones, and have their characters ridicule the rest as absurd. For example, in the movie Blade, the vampire hunter Blade tells Karen Jenson what kills vampires (stakes, silver, and sunlight), and dismisses tactics seen in vampire movies (namely crosses and running water) as ineffective. Some vampires can fly. This power may be supernatural levitation, or it may be connected to the vampire's shape-shifting ability. Some traditions hold that a vampire cannot enter a house unless he or she is invited in. Generally, a vampire needs be invited in only once and then can come and go at will. Stephen King's novel Salem's Lot explored an unusual direction with this myth in having one of the protagonists revoke a vampire's invitation to a house; the vampire was forced to flee the building immediately. This is also featured in the American TV series True Blood, where Sookie withdraws her invitation on a number of occasions, causing vampires to be thrown out by supernatural forces. Also, in The Vampire Diaries when a newly turned vampire wakes up in a house that he was not invited into, he immediately flees.

Some tales maintain that vampires must return to a coffin or to their "native soil" before sunrise to take their rest safely. Others place native soil in their coffins, especially if they have relocated. Still other vampire stories, such as Le Fanu's Carmilla, maintain that vampires must return to their coffins, but sleep in several inches of blood as opposed to soil. Vampires are generally held to be unable to bear children, though the concept of a "half vampire" and similar creatures does exist in folklore and in some modern fiction. Some fictional vampires are fascinated with counting, an idea derived from folk stories about vampires being compelled to stop and count any spilled grain that they find in their path. The most famous fictional counting vampire is likely the Muppet character Count von Count on television's Sesame Street. Other examples include a fifth season episode of the X-Files titled Bad Blood, and the Discworld novel, Carpe Jugulum by Terry Pratchett. Some modern fictional vampires are portrayed as having magical powers beyond those originally assigned by myth, typically also possessing the powers of a witch or seer. Such examples include Drusilla from Buffy the Vampire Slayer (Drusilla was a seer before she was a vampire, and carried those powers into her undeath), and Olivia Nightshade from The Nightshade Chronicles. Also, vampires from the Vampire Academy books, also known as the moroi, are skilled in elemental magic. Also, in the Twilight series, certain vampires appear to have special gifts like Edward (telepathy), Alice (visions), Bella (shielding), that are either supernatural or evolved from their own personalities like Victoria (survival instinct).

=== Vampire hybrids ===
The dhampir, the offspring of a vampire and a human known from Serbian folklore, has been popularized in recent fiction.

== Literature ==
=== Poems ===
- Der Vampir ('The Vampire') by Heinrich Ossenfelder (1748)
- "Die Braut von Korinth" ('The Bride of Corinth') by Johann Wolfgang von Goethe (1797)
- Thalaba the Destroyer by Robert Southey (1801)
- "The Vampyre" by John Stagg (1810)
- The Giaour by Lord Byron (1813)
- Christabel by Samuel Taylor Coleridge (1816)
- "La Belle Dame Sans Merci" by John Keats (1820)
- "Vurdalak" by Alexander Sergeyevich Pushkin (1836)
- "The Vampyre, Compylt into Meeter" by James Clerk Maxwell (1845)
- Metamorphosis of the Vampire by Charles Baudelaire (1857)
- The Vampire (Strigoiul) by Vasile Alecsandri (1897)
- "The Vampire" by Rudyard Kipling (1897)
  - The Vampire by Philip Burne-Jones (1897)
- "The Vampire: 1914" by Conrad Aiken (1924)

=== Prose ===
- "Fragment of a Novel", unfinished vampire story by Lord Byron (1819)
- The Vampyre by John William Polidori (1819)
- The Black Vampyre by Uriah D'Arcy (1819)
- Lord Ruthwen ou les vampires by Cyprien Bérard (1820), often attributed to Charles Nodier who wrote a play based on the novel
- "Vampirismus" in The Serapion Brethren volume 4 by E. T. A. Hoffmann (1821)
- "Wake Not the Dead" by Ernst Raupach (1822), often misattributed to Johann Ludwig Tieck
- The Virgin Vampire by Étienne-Léon de Lamothe-Langon (1825)
- Der Vampyr; Oder, Die Todtenbraut: Ein Roman Nach Neugriechischen Volkssagen ("The Vampire; or, The Dead Bride: A Novel Based on Modern Greek Folk Tales") by Theodor Hildebrand (1828)
- "La Morte Amoureuse" ("The Dead Woman in Love") by Théophile Gautier (1836)
- The Family of the Vourdalak by Count Alexis Tolstoy (1843)
- "Der Fremde" ('The Stranger') by Karl Adolf von Wachsmann (1843), translated as The Mysterious Stranger (1854)
- Varney the Vampire or The Feast of Blood by James Malcolm Rymer or Thomas Peckett Prest (1845–1847)
- Vampire by Vladimir Dal (1848)
- The Pale Lady / The Vampire of the Carpathians by Alexandre Dumas (1849)
- Le Chevalier Ténèbre (Knightshade) by Paul Féval (1860)
- La Vampire (The Vampire Countess) by Paul Féval (1865)
- La Femme Immortelle (The Immortal Woman) by Pierre Alexis de Ponson du Terrail (1869)
- Il Vampiro. Storia Vera (The Vampire: True Story) by Franco Mistrali (1869)
- Carmilla (1872) by Sheridan Le Fanu
- La Ville Vampire (Vampire City) by Paul Féval (1874)
- Le Capitaine Vampire (Captain Vampire) by Marie Nizet (1879)
- After Ninety Years by Milovan Glišić (1880)
- The Fate of Madame Cabanel by Eliza Lynn Linton (1880)
- Manor by Karl Heinrich Ulrichs (1884)
- The True Story of a Vampire by Count Stanislaus Eric Stenbock (1894)
- Lilith by George MacDonald (1895)
- Dracula by Bram Stoker (1897)
- The Blood of the Vampire by Florence Marryat (1897)
- The Tomb of Sarah by F. G. Loring (1900)
- The House of the Vampire by George Sylvester Viereck (1907)
- Vampiro by Enrico Boni (1908)
- "For the Blood Is the Life" by F. Marion Crawford (1911)
- Wampir ('The Vampire') by Władysław Reymont (1911)
- "The Room in the Tower" by E. F. Benson (1912)
- "Dracula's Guest" by Bram Stoker (1914)
- The Vampire by Jan Neruda (1920 – posthumous)
- Vampire by Hanns Heinz Ewers (1921)
- "Mrs. Amworth" by E. F. Benson (1922)
- "Bewitched" by Edith Wharton (1927)
- "The Hills of the Dead" by Robert E. Howard (1930)
- "The Dark Castle" by Marion Brandon (1931)
- Revelations in Black by Carl Jacobi (1933)
- Vampires Overhead by Alan Hyder (1935)
- Doom of the House of Duryea by Earl Peirce Jr. (1936)
- Lady Christina by Mircea Eliade (1936)
- "The Man Upstairs" by Ray Bradbury (1943)
- "The Girl with the Hungry Eyes" by Fritz Leiber (1949)
- I Am Legend by Richard Matheson (1954)
- "The Longest Night" by Ray Russell (1960)
- Progeny of the Adder by Les Whitten (1965)
- Vampire's Moon by Peter Saxon (1970)
- The Night Stalker by Jeff Rice (1973)
- Pages from a Young Girl's Journal by Robert Aickman (1973)
- 'Salem's Lot by Stephen King (1975)
  - "One for the Road" by Stephen King (1977). A sequel to 'Salem's Lot
  - "The Night Flier" by Stephen King (1988)
  - "Popsy" by Stephen King (1993)
  - "The Little Sisters of Eluria" by Stephen King (1998)
  - "The Dark Tower V: Wolves of the Calla" by Stephen King (2003)
  - "The Dark Tower VII: The Dark Tower" by Stephen King (2004)
- The Space Vampires by Colin Wilson (1976)
- Interview with the Vampire by Anne Rice (1976)
- The Silmarillion by J.R.R. Tolkien (1977)
- The Vampire Tapestry by Suzy McKee Charnas (1980)
- The Hunger by Whitley Strieber (1981)
- The Keep by F. Paul Wilson (1981)
- They Thirst by Robert McCammon (1981)
- The Journal of Edwin Underhill by Peter Tonkin (1981)
- Fevre Dream by George R. R. Martin (1982)
- The Delicate Dependency by Michael Talbot (1982)
- The Dragon Waiting by John M. Ford (1983)
- The Light at the End by John Skipp and Craig Spector (1986)
- Those Who Hunt the Night (UK title: Immortal Blood) by Barbara Hambly (1988)
- The Stress of Her Regard by Tim Powers (1989)
- Vampire$ by John Steakley (1990)
- The Gilda Stories by Jewelle Gomez (1991)
- The Silver Kiss by Annette Curtis Klause (1991)
- Vampire of the Mists by Christie Golden (1991)
- Knight of the Black Rose by James Lowder (1991)
- Children of the Night by Dan Simmons (1992)
- Lost Souls by Poppy Z. Brite (1992)
- Agyar by Steven Brust (1993)
- The books I, Strahd, Memories of the Vampire (1993) and I, Strahd, the War with Azalin by P. N. Elrod tells the tale of the vampire lord Strahd von Zarovich, who occupies the castle Ravenloft
- Travelling with the Dead by Barbara Hambly (1995). A sequel to Immortal Blood
- Dracula the Undead by Freda Warrington (1997) (commissioned by Penguin books as a sequel to Bram Stoker's Dracula for the centenary of the latter's first publication)
- Carpe Jugulum by Terry Pratchett (1998)
- Sunshine by Robin McKinley (2003)
- Let the Right One In (Låt Den Rätte Komma In in the original Swedish) by John Ajvide Lindqvist (2004). Translated into English in 2007
- The Historian by Elizabeth Kostova (2005)
- Fledgling by Octavia Butler (2005)
- Renfield: Slave of Dracula by Barbara Hambly (2006)
- "Morrigan's Cross", "Dance of the Gods" and "Valley of Silence" (The Circle Trilogy) by Nora Roberts (2006)
- Empire V (the original Russian title Ампир В is an acronym of the word "vampire") by Victor Pelevin (2006)
- Fangland by John Marks (2007)
- Blood Oath by Christopher Farnsworth (2010).
- Modern Marvels – Viktoriana by Wayne Reinagel (2011)
- Batman Apollo (original Russian title Бэтман Аполло) by Victor Pelevin (2013)
- NOS4A2 by Joe Hill (2013)
- Doctor Sleep by Stephen King (2013). A sequel to King's novel The Shining (1977)
- With the People from the Bridge by Dimitris Lyacos (2014)
- The Vampyre of Gotham by Lev Raphael (2014)
- Vlad, the last confession by Chris Humphreys
- The Orange Spong and Storytelling at the Vamp-Art Café by St. Sukie de la Croix (2020)
- Silver Under Nightfall by Rin Chupeco (2022)
- Woman, Eating by Claire Kohda (2022)
- Vampires of El Norte by Isabel Cañas (2023)
- Hungerstone by Kat Dunn (2025)
- The Buffalo Hunter Hunter by Stephen Graham Jones (2025)
- The Red Sacrament by Sara Hinkley (2026)

== Fiction series ==
There are several recent series in vampire fiction, of variable literary quality. They tend to either take the form of direct sequels (or prequels) to the first book published or detail the ongoing adventures of particular characters.

- Marilyn Ross's Barnabas Collins series (1966–1971)
- Fred Saberhagen's Vlad Tepes series (1975–2002)
- Anne Rice's Vampire Chronicles series (1976–2018)
- Chelsea Quinn Yarbro's Saint-Germain series (1978–)
- Whitley Strieber's The Hunger series (1981–2002)
- Yoshitaka Amano's Vampire Hunter D series (1983–)
- Brian Lumley's Necroscope series (1986–)
- Elaine Bergstrom's Austra Vampires series (1989–)
- Nancy A. Collins's Sonja Blue series (1989–)
- P. N. Elrod's Vampire Files series (1990–)
- Tanya Huff's Blood Books series (1991–1997)
- Kim Newman's Anno Dracula series (1992–)
- Freda Warrington's Bloodwine series (1992–)
- Laurell K. Hamilton's Anita Blake: Vampire Hunter series (1993–)
- Maggie Shayne's Wings in the Night series (1993–)
- Christopher Golden's Shadow Saga (1994–2014)
- Christopher Moore's A Love Story series (1995–2007)
- Christine Feehan's Dark series (1999–)
- Gene Wolfe's Urth: Book of the Short Sun trilogy (1999–2001)
- Jim Butcher's The Dresden Files series (2000–). Not all of these novels concern themselves largely with vampires, but a war between vampires and wizards figures heavily in the story
- Darren Shan's The Saga of Darren Shan series (2000–2006)
- Charlaine Harris's The Southern Vampire Mysteries (2001–2013)
- Sherrilyn Kenyon's Dark-Hunter (2002–)
- E. E. Knight's Vampire Earth series (2003–)
- MaryJanice Davidson's Undead series (2004–)
- Kim Harrison's Hollows series (2004–)
- Charlie Huston's Joe Pitt Casefiles series (2005–)
- Stephenie Meyer's Twilight series (2005–2008)
- Jenna Black's Guardians of The Night series (2006–)
- Kresley Cole's The Immortals After Dark series (2006–)
- Lara Adrian's Midnight Breed series (2007–)
- Jeaniene Frost's Night Huntress series (2007–)
- Cassandra Clare's The Mortal Instruments series (2007–2014, excluding spin-off books)
- Guillermo del Toro with Chuck Hogan's The Strain (2009), The Fall (2010) and The Night Eternal (2011) (La trilogía de la oscuridad)
- Faith Hunter's Jane Yellowrock series (2009–)
- Jasper Kent's Danilov Quintet (2009–)
- Justin Cronin's The Passage (2010), The Twelve (2012) and City of Mirrors (2016)
- Deborah Harkness's A Discovery of Witches (2011–2018)
- J. R. Ward's Black Dagger Brotherhood series (2011–)
- P. C. Cast and Kristin Cast's House of Night series
- Les Daniels' Don Sebastian: Vampire Chronicles series
- P. N. Elrod's Jonathan Barrett, Gentleman Vampire series
- Richelle Mead's Vampire Academy and Bloodlines series
- L. J. Smith's The Vampire Diaries series
- Jeanne C. Stein's Anna Strong series
- David Wellington's Thirteen Bullets, 99 Coffins, Vampire Zero, 23 Hours (Laura Caxton, James Arkeley series)
- Chloe Neill's Chicagoland Vampires series

White Wolf, a maker of role-playing games, releases novels set in the fantasy world of its Vampire: The Masquerade game. These series of novels were released in 13-book sets, each corresponding to one of the 13 clans of vampires in their game universe.

== Juvenile fiction ==
- The Little Vampire series by Angela Sommer-Bodenburg (1979)
- The Bunnicula series by Deborah Howe and James Howe (1979)
- The Darkangel series by Meredith Ann Pierce (1982–1990)
- Vampire Express (1984) book #31 in Choose Your Own Adventure
- The School for Vampires series by Jackie Niebisch (1985)
- The Little Dracula series by Martin Waddell and Joseph Wright (1986–2001)
- The Vampire Diaries series by L. J. Smith (author) (1991–)
- The Silver Kiss by Annette Curtis Klause (1992)
- The Last Vampire series by Christopher Pike (1994–)
- Companions of the Night by Vivian Vande Velde (1995)
- The Night World series by L. J. Smith (1996–)
- How to Be a Vampire by R. L. Stine (1996)
  - "A Vampire in the Neighborhood" short story in Tales to Give you Goosebumps by R.L. Stine (1994)
  - Vampire Breath book #49 in the Goosebumps series by R.L. Stine (1996)
  - Please Don't Feed the Vampire! book #15 in the Give Yourself Goosebumps series by R.L. Stine (1997)
  - The Chronicles of Vladimir Tod series by Z Brewer (2007)
  - Who's Your Mummy? book #6 in the Goosebumps HorrorLand series by R.L. Stine (2009)
  - Welcome to HorrorLand: A Survival Guide book #13 in the Goosebumps Horrorland series by R.L. Stine (2009)
  - Goosebumps Monster Survival Guide (2015)
  - Biting for Blood (1996) book #7 in Choose Your Own Nightmare
- Amelia Atwater-Rhodes's novels In the Forests of the Night (1999), Demon in My View (2000), Shattered Mirror (2001), Midnight Predator (2002) and Persistence of Memory (2008)
- The Saga of Darren Shan, also known as the Cirque Du Freak series by Darren Shan (2000–2004)
- Sweetblood by Pete Hautman (2003)
- The Vampire Kisses series by Ellen Schreiber (2005–)
- Peeps by Scott Westerfeld (2005)
- The Twilight series by Stephenie Meyer (2005–2008)
- The Last Days by Scott Westerfeld (2006)
- The Blue Bloods series by Melissa de la Cruz (2006–)
- The Vampire Academy series by Richelle Mead (2006–2010)
- Tantalize by Cynthia Leitich Smith (2007)
- The House of Night series by P. C. Cast and Kristin Cast (2007–)
- The Mortal Instruments series by Cassandra Clare (2007 to 2014 - excluding spin-off books)
- The Reformed Vampire Support Group by Catherine Jinks (2009)
- Jessica's Guide to Dating on the Dark Side by Beth Fantaskey (2009)
- The Coldest Girl in Coldtown by Holly Black (2013)
- The Simon Snow series by Rainbow Rowell (2015-2021)
- The Crave series by Tracy Wolff (2020-2023)

== Vampire fiction based on TV series ==
- Angel; see: List of Angel novels
- Being Human; see: Being Human novels
- Buffy the Vampire Slayer; see:
  - List of Buffy the Vampire Slayer novels
  - List of Buffyverse novels
- Carmilla; see: Carmilla novelization
- Doctor Who; see:
  - Blood Harvest
  - Goth Opera
  - World Game
  - The Eight Doctors
  - Vampire Science
  - The Vampire Curse
  - Short Trips: Defining Patterns: Twilight's End
- Dark Shadows; see Dark Shadows novels (novels #6-32)
- Forever Knight; see Forever Knight novels
- I Heart Vampires; see I Heart Vampires: Birth (A Confessions of a High School Vampire Novel)
- The Originals; see The Originals novels
- The Vampire Diaries; see: Stefan's Diaries

== Comic books ==
Comic books and graphic novels which feature vampires include Vampirella (Warren Publishing, 1969), Morbius the Living Vampire (Marvel, 1971), The Poe Clan (Shogakukan 1972), The Tomb of Dracula (Marvel Comics, 1972), Blade (Marvel, 1973), I...Vampire (DC Comics, 1981), Hellsing (Shonen Gahosha, 1997), Vampire Girl (Shodensha, 1999–unknown), 30 Days of Night (IDW Publishing, 2002), Chibi Vampire (Monthly Dragon Age, 2003), JoJo's Bizarre Adventure (Weekly Shonen Jump 1986–2004, Ultra Jump 2004-) Rosario + Vampire (Monthly Shōnen Jump 2004), Vampire Knight (LaLa, 2005), Blood Alone (MediaWorks, 2005), Dracula vs. King Arthur (Silent Devil Productions, 2005), Dance in the Vampire Bund (Media Factory, 2006), Anita Blake: Vampire Hunter: Guilty Pleasures (Dabel Brothers Productions/Marvel Comics, 2007), Half Dead (Dabel Brothers Productions/Marvel Comics, 2007), Buffy the Vampire Slayer Season Eight (Dark Horse Comics, 2007), Black Rose Alice (Akita Shoten, 2008), Nosferatu (Viper Comics, 2010), Twilight: The Graphic Novel (2010) and He's My Only Vampire (Kodansha, 2010).

Proinsias Cassidy, the supporting lead male in Garth Ennis' comic book series Preacher (DC/Vertigo, 1995), is a vampire of Irish origin. In addition, many major superheroes have faced vampire supervillains at some point. In the Belgo-French comic Le Bal du rat mort, police inspector Jean Lamorgue is a hybrid vampire and he is a king of rats. He is guiding an invasion of rats in Ostend and he sucks the blood of his human victims.

In 2009, Zuda Comics launched La Morté Sisters, a story of teenage vampirism in a Catholic orphanage taking place in South Philadelphia. The story follows new girl Maddie in a world of ninja nuns and black magic.

American Vampire, created by Scott Snyder, was published in 2010. It explores the idea of the evolution of vampires, leading to new species throughout American history.

== Magazines ==
Magazines which feature vampires include Bite me magazine (launched 1999). Typical features include interviews with vampire actors, features on famous vampire film classics, vampire-related news, forthcoming vampire film and book releases.

Defunct vampire magazines include Crimson (England); Journal of the Dark (US), Father Sebastiaan's Vampyre Magazine (US) and The Velvet Vampyre (available to members of the disbanded The Vampyre Society, England).

== See also ==
- Vampire film
- List of vampire films
- List of vampire television series
- List of vampires
- List of dhampirs

== Bibliography ==
- Freelad, Cynthia A. (2000) The Naked and the Undead: Evil and the Appeal of Horror. Westview Pres Adaptations. Greenwood Press.
- Melton, J. Gordon. (1999) The Vampire Book: The Encyclopedia of the Undead. Visible Ink Press.
- Montague Summers (1928) The Vampire: His Kith and Kin, (book reprinted with alternate title: Vampires and Vampirism ISBN 0-486-43996-8). Chapter 5 - "The Vampire in Literature" is reprinted in Clive Bloom (2007) Gothic Horror: 108–126. Basingstoke: Palgrave Macmillan.
- El estudio académico más completo en español sobre el origen y evolución de los vampiros: Toribio-Hernández, Edgar. (2018). EL ORIGEN Y EVOLUCIÓN DE LOS VAMPIROS: MONSTRUOS DE LA FANTASÍA. Acta literaria, (57), 39-70. https://dx.doi.org/10.4067/S0717-68482018000200039
- Townsend, Dorian Aleksandra, From Upyr' to Vampire: The Slavic Vampire Myth in Russian Literature, Ph.D. Dissertation, School of German and Russian Studies, Faculty of Arts & Social Sciences, University of New South Wales, May 2011.
- M. J. Trow (2003) Vlad the Impaler. Sutton: Stroud.
