= Poison Tree (novel) =

Novel by Amelia Atwater-Rhodes

- Author: Amelia Atwater-Rhodes
- Cover artist: Miranda Adria
- Language: English
- Series: Den of Shadows
- Genre: Gothic, Horror, Teen, Vampire
- Publisher: Delacorte Press, a division of Random House
- Publication date: July 10, 2012
- Publication place: United States
- Media type: Print (Hardcover)
- Pages: 219 pp (first edition hardcover)
- ISBN: 978-0-385-73754-8
- Preceded by: All Just Glass
- Followed by: Promises to Keep

Poison Tree is a 2012 young adult fiction novel by American author Amelia Atwater-Rhodes and is her thirteenth novel. The book was published on July 10, 2012 and is the eighth novel in the Den of Shadows series. The novel's title is derived from a poem by William Blake entitled "A Poison Tree", which is featured at the beginning of the novel. Atwater-Rhodes stated that Poison Tree was originally titled Tiger Rise, that she had initially filmed it as a movie with her friends, and that the book took her a long time to write.

== Summary ==
Sarik and Alysia both have pasts that they want to escape and ties to the supernatural world. Sarik is capable of shapeshifting into a tiger, while Alysia once worked as an Onyx mercenary- a profession that causes trouble to follow her wherever she goes. Upon her arrival at SingleEarth Haven Number Four, Sarik's vampiric lover Jason is attacked by a suspicious Onyx bounty hunter and the Haven is dragged into the middle of a disaster. With a bounty on her head for anyone that can capture her, both Sarik and Alysia must decide what price they will pay to save Haven Number Four even as it turns into a warfield around them.

== Reception ==
Reception for Poison Tree has been mostly positive, with the book garnering positive reviews from Publishers Weekly and Teenreads. Kirkus Reviews cited that the book was "Complicated, but suspenseful".
