= Lorena Amkie =

Mexican writer

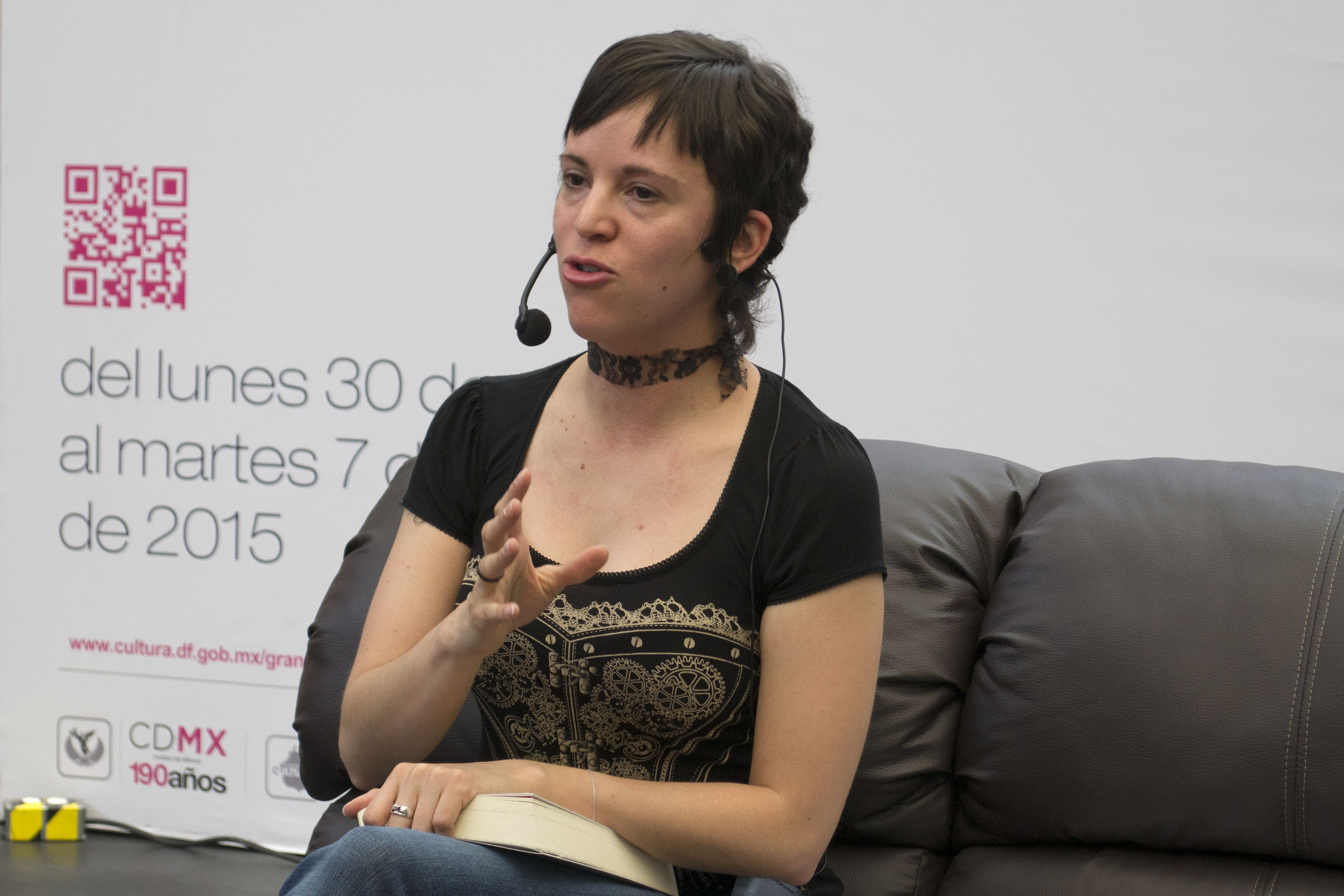
- Amkie in 2015
- Born: Lorena Amkie Cheirif; 1981 (age 44–45); Mexico City, Mexico
- Occupation: Novelist
- Writing career
- Period: 2011–present
- Genres: Gothic fiction, Vampire literature
- Notable works: Gothic Doll; El Club de los perdedores
- Website: www.lorenaamkie.com

Lorena Amkie Cheirif (Mexico City, 1981) is a writer and journalist from Mexico, known for her Gothic Doll saga of juvenile novels. She also has a channel on YouTube.

== Early years ==
Amkie was born in Mexico City in 1981. Her mother, a child therapist, helped her develop a taste for writing, using different techniques with her since she was five years old. With the support of her two parents towards her passion for reading, Amkie wrote her first novel at the age of 20, not finishing it until she was 27 years old. Initially wanting to study Literature or Philosophy, she decided to opt for a degree in communications, thinking that with one of those careers she would not be able to obtain a job. During her days as a student, Amkie became a victim of bullying, an experience which years later would inspire her to write one of her novels.

== Career ==
After graduating, Amkie worked in a magazine for some time, until she received a scholarship from the State of Mexico to write a book. With this scholarship, she began to dedicate full time to literature.

Her first book, Gothic Doll, was published in 2010, sold over 20,000 copies in Mexico and marked the beginning of her first trilogy, which continued with Gothic Soul and Gothic Fate, as well as Gothic More, an add-on with notes from the author that marked the end of the series in 2014. The plot of the trilogy, a story about a teenage vampire and her confrontation with reality, was born of the author's taste for the vampire literature.

Her next novel, El Club de los perdedores ("The Losers' Club") was published in 2015 and was well received by the critics and the market. Based on her own experiences, but also on frequent contact with her readers, Lorena explored topics such as bullying and the search for identity.

In addition to publishing her books, Lorena has stood out for promoting reading to young audiences through various festivals, fairs, and her social networks.

Since 2016, Amkie has created her official YouTube channel, where she gives advice and tips to aspiring writers.

== Works ==
Year	Title	Publishing House	ISBN	Notes
2010	Gothic Doll (En los brazos de Mael)	Ediciones B		Re-published by Planeta in 2012
2012	Gothic Soul (El retorno de Maya)	Destino		
2013	Gothic Fate (La última elegía)	Destino		
2014	Gothic More	Destino		Notes from the author with regards to the Gothic Doll trilogy
2015	El Club de los Perdedores	Destino	ISBN 978-84-08-15959-9	
2015	Relatos de Impunidad	Para Leer en Libertad AC		Free distribution
2016	Las Catrinas	Destino	ISBN 978-607-07-3618-6	The main character appears also in El Club de los Perdedores.
2017	Esta es mi pinche Biblia	Panamericana	ISBN 9789583053870	Co-written with Ricardo Farías
2018	No te mueras, Eli	SM de Ediciones		
2019	Sirenas	Ediciones B		
2020	Mujer Mutante Busca	Amiba Ediciones		
