= Hawksong =

Novel by Amelia Atwater-Rhodes

- 2003 cover
- Author: Amelia Atwater-Rhodes
- Cover artist: Cliff Nielsen
- Language: English
- Series: The Kiesha'ra Series
- Genre: Horror, Fantasy novel, Romance
- Publisher: Random House, Delacorte
- Publication date: July 2003
- Publication place: United States
- Media type: Print (Hardcover), paperback
- Pages: 243 pp (hardcover first printing)
- ISBN: 0-385-73071-3
- Preceded by: Midnight Predator (2002)
- Followed by: Snakecharm (2004)

Hawksong is the first in a five-book series of young adult fantasy shapeshifter novels called The Kiesha'ra Series. It was written by American author Amelia Atwater-Rhodes and published in 2003.

Narrated by Danica Shardae, heir to the Tuuli Thea. During this first book in the Keisha'ra series, Danica is 16. Danica's tentative marriage to Zane Cobriana ends the thousands of years of warring between their people. The title refers to a lullaby that Danica sings to Zane's younger brother Gregory at the beginning of the book, while the boy is dying on the battlefield.

== Plot summary ==
The book centers on two different kinds of shapeshifters: the avians and the serpiente. The avians have birds for second forms and their royal line consists of golden hawks. Their leader is the Tuuli Thea, or queen. The queen's pair bond is called her Alistair. Avian culture is uptight and strict, and it centers on, "avian reserve," the ability to keep complete control of one's emotions at all times. Avians do not lose their temper and they do not cry, no matter what the situation. The serpiente have the second form of a snake. Their royal line is the Cobriana, cobra shapeshifters descended from Kiesha, and their king is called the Diente. Their queen is the Naga. Serpiente wear sensual outfits and are free with their emotions, even in situations where some control might be appropriate. They are passionate and sometimes violent, the complete opposite of the avians. The two groups have been at war beyond living memory, so that nobody even remembers how the fighting started. The reason behind the war starting is given in Falcondance. All they know is that they hate each other and they will keep fighting until one of them is destroyed.

Danica Shardae and her second form as pictured on the cover of Hawksong.

The book takes place in roughly 705 BCE and is the romantic story of Danica Shardae, the heir to the Tuuli Thea. The novel opens with Danica walking the latest bloody battlefield and her discovery of the fallen Gregory Cobriana, who is the younger brother of the current Arami (Prince, soon to be Diente/King), Zane Cobriana. Despite her guards' warnings, Danica stays by Gregory's side, holding him, and singing the Hawksong, a lullaby, until the young prince passes.

After Zane learns what Danica did for his brother, he sends his sister to the avians: the serpiente want peace. After a trip to the wise tiger shapeshifters, the Mistari, Zane and Danica secretly agree to marry despite their families' objections over the Mistari idea as well as their own hesitations. Danica has feelings for Andreios (Rei), her best friend, a crow and the leader of the Royal Flight and the highest commander in the avian army. Zane also has a relationship with the head of his palace guard, a white viper named Adelina. But over the course of the novel Zane and Danica grow fond of each other and eventually fall in love, but not before Adelina joins up with Karl, a member of the Royal Flight, to end the union between Zane and Danica. Adelina accidentally kills Zane's mother while attempting to assassinate Danica, who is critically wounded. However, she survives while Zane stays at her side. Their love continues from Zane's view, in Snakecharm.

== Awards and nominations ==
The novel was an ALA Quick Pick, School Library Journal Best Book of the Year, and Voice of Youth Advocates Best Science Fiction, Fantasy, and Horror selection.

== Sequel ==
The sequel to Hawksong is Snakecharm, which was released in 2004.
