= Brâncoveanu =

Brâncoveanu may refer to:

- Constantin Brâncoveanu
  - Constantin Brâncoveanu metro station
  - Constantin Brâncoveanu University
  - Constantin Brâncoveanu, a village in Dragalina Commune, Călăraşi County, Romania
- Brâncoveanu, a village in Odobeşti Commune, Dâmboviţa County, Romania

== See also ==
- Brâncovenesc, type of architecture developed in Wallachia and Transylvania during the reign of Constantin Brâncoveanu
- Brâncovenești (disambiguation)
- Brâncoveni
- Brâncoveanca
- Branković
- Branko
- Branco (disambiguation)
