= Brâncovenești =

Brâncoveneşti may refer to:

- Craiovești, later known as Brâncoveneşti, a Romanian boyar family
- Brâncovenești, Mureș, a commune in Mureș County, Romania

== See also ==
- Brâncovenesc, an architectural style of 17th–18th century Romania
- Brâncoveni, Oltenia, Romania
- Brâncoveanu (disambiguation)
