= Wyvernhail =

Novel by Amelia Atwater-Rhodes

- 2007 cover
- Author: Amelia Atwater-Rhodes
- Cover artist: Cliff Nielsen
- Language: English
- Series: The Kiesha'ra Series
- Genre: Fantasy novel
- Published: 2007 (Delacorte Press Books for Young Readers)
- Publication place: United States
- Media type: Hardback
- Pages: 192 pp (hardcover first printing
- ISBN: 978-0-385-73436-3
- OCLC: 81916750
- LC Class: PZ7.A8925 Wyv 2007
- Preceded by: Wolfcry

Wyvernhail is the fifth book in the Kiesha'ra Series by Amelia Atwater-Rhodes. It was preceded by Wolfcry in 2006. It is told from the point of view of Hai the gyrfalcon, cobra mix, who is struggling to find a way out of Ecl, or the darkness.

It was released on September 11, 2007.

== Plot ==
Wyvernhail is the story of Hai - the mongrel daughter of the Falcon Darien and Zane's older brother, Anjay - putting her in line for the Cobriana throne (though crippled and powerless). Hai is a creature out of place - not Avian, but a falcon poisoned with cobra blood .

When Hai's cousin, Oliza Shardae Cobriana, abdicates the throne of Wyvern's Court, Hai has visions only of destruction: the serpiente king Salem, dying in her arms; the dutiful falcon guard, Nicias, unable to save a generation of children; and Wyvern's Court engulfed in flames. The cause of this future is Keyi, the daughter of Oliza and Vere, who, after accidentally killing her mother, seems to enjoy chaos and death and brings it upon Wyvern's Court.

To protect her new home, Hai makes choices that put her in conflict with those who depend on her.

In order to protect the people and the world she loves from the future she sees in increasingly horrific visions, Hai is forced to throw away her own happiness and ascend the serpiente throne.

Using all the power she had at her disposal, she split her soul and pushed into him her serpiente magic. Nicias kept hold of her to keep her from diving too deep into Ecl, and they were unconscious for a few days. Rosalind, who did not trust Hai, was not sure what to do about her, and apologizes and admits she had been confused for a long time. Darien, Hai's falcon mother, comes to Wyvern's Court and says that the Empress Cjarsa felt a new falcon being born. When Hai reaches for her cobra scales, she could not have it ripple across her skin, and when she tried to return to her broken falcon form, she let out a painful scream and Nicias held onto her. However, when she reached for the falcon magic of Ahnmik, she felt her magic rub upon Nicias's magic, and found that she was now truly falcon. Nicias and Oliza (grudgingly) fixed Hai's wings after they found out she was pure falcon. She and Nicias are together. Then she agrees to dance with Vere Obsidian.

== Narraration ==
Wyvernhail is narrated by Hai, mongrel falcon-cobra daughter of Darien and Anjay Cobriana.
