= Demon in My View =

Novel by Amelia Atwater-Rhodes

- 2000 Cover
- Author: Amelia Atwater-Rhodes
- Original title: Bitter Life
- Cover artist: Cliff Nielsen
- Language: English
- Series: Den of Shadows
- Genre: Gothic, Horror, Vampire, Teen
- Publisher: Delacorte Press, a division of Random House
- Publication date: May 9, 2000
- Publication place: United States
- Media type: Print (hardback & paperback)
- Pages: 176 pp (first edition hardcover)
- ISBN: 0-385-32720-X (first edition hardcover)
- Preceded by: In the Forests of the Night (1999)
- Followed by: Shattered Mirror (2001)

Demon in My View is a vampire novel written by Amelia Atwater-Rhodes, and published on May 9, 2000. Originally entitled Bitter Life, it was published when the author was 16. It is the follow-up to In the Forests of the Night, which she wrote at the age of 13. The title refers Edgar Allan Poe’s poem "Alone", which appears in the beginning of the book.

The novel was an ALA Quick Pick. The Bulletin of the Center for Children's Books remarked that it is “A fast-paced vampire novel”, while Publishers Weekly has said that “readers will drain… in one big gulp". The Bulletin calls it "a fast-paced vampire novel with an anti-Buffy heroine and a studly vampire who aren't going to let a little thing like death stand between them."

== Plot summary ==
The book is set in the fictional town of Ramsa, New York, and centers around teenager Jessica Ashley Allodola. Jessica is gorgeous and has a perfect body, but the people in her town avoid her. At Ramsa High, many students are afraid of her and some think she's a witch. Instead of trying to bond to people, Jessica writes books about vampires and witches. She has just published her first book, "Tiger, Tiger", under the pen name Ash Night.

As her senior year starts, there are two new students, Caryn Rashida and Alex Remington. Jessica is instantly stunned by the fact that Alex looks exactly like Aubrey, a character in "Tiger, Tiger." However, since Jessica believes vampires aren't real, she convinces herself that he's not Aubrey. Both Caryn and Alex show an interest in Jessica. Jessica finds Alex fascinating but considers Caryn a nuisance.

After a few clues, Jessica finds out that the books she has been writing are completely true. That Alex is actually the vampire Aubrey and Caryn is a Smoke witch. Many of the vampires wish to kill her for exposing their secrets. Aubrey had initially planned to kill her, but after meeting her, he's uncertain of what to do. After Jessica is attacked by Fala, another vampire, Aubrey changes Jessica into a vampire.

Throughout the story, Jessica pieces together clues regarding her birth. Her mother was Jazlyn and had been offered immortality numerous times by Siete, the creator of the vampires. After her husband's death, the pregnant Jazlyn accepted the offer in a moment of desperation and Siete changed her. However, after years of life as a vampire, her regret became too strong. A Smoke witch, Monica, offered to give her back her humanity. Monica died in the process, but she succeeded. A few months later, Jazlyn's child was born. However, the child, Jessica, held no resemblance to either of her biological parents. Instead, after almost two decades in an undead womb, she resembled Siete. Her green eyes, black hair, pale skin, and vampiric traces in her aura were all from him and Jazlyn could not look at her. So Jazlyn gave Jessica up for adoption.

== Reception ==
The second novel of the series received a generally positive review, especially from critics that review primarily young adult novels. Teen People said the book was "a good Gothic chiller," while Boston Magazine said it was "elaborately imagined," whilst the New Yorker said, "Amelia has an uncanny understanding of the kind of narrative that makes for a successful potboiler: she's skilled at creating characters the reader easily and instantly bonds with, and she's resourceful when it comes to putting them in jeopardy." Kirkus Reviews found Demon In My View "Full of atmospherics, but weak on style" and "Not bad for a 15-year-old, but not a well-written, fully realized novel either. " while Publishers Weekly wrote "Atwater-Rhodes exercises impressive control over the complex lineages she has imagined, and she comes up with creative solutions to advance her story. Readers will drain this book in one big gulp."
