= Den of Shadows =

Set of fantasy novels by Amelia Atwater-Rhodes

Den of Shadows is a set of fantasy novels written by American author Amelia Atwater-Rhodes. The novels follow an interconnected group of supernatural creatures, such as vampires, ghosts, and shapeshifters. It is the predecessor of Atwater-Rhodes' five volume The Kiesha'ra Series.

The novels included in Den of Shadows are In the Forests of the Night, Demon in My View, Shattered Mirror, Midnight Predator, Persistence of Memory, Token of Darkness, All Just Glass, Poison Tree, Promises to Keep; and the books from the Maeve’ra Trilogy, Bloodwitch, Bloodkin, and Bloodtraitor.

The Den of Shadows is also the name of Atwater-Rhodes' official site. The site was originally called "Nyeusigrube", which translated to "den of shadows" in the books' constructed language.

== Novels ==
=== 1999 In the Forests of the Night ===
This novel follows a woman born under the name Rachel Weatere in 1684. She changes her name to Risika after she is turned into a vampire against her will. 300 years later, she must face her past, including a mysterious stalker whom she knows nothing about, to confront her future.

=== 2001 Shattered Mirror ===
Sarah Vida, a witch, has set her sights on a vampire named Nikolas. The young witch attends high school like a normal teenager but meets and befriends Christopher, a vampire who is later revealed to be the twin of Nikolas, against the laws of the Vida coven. Although Sarah tries to break off the friendship with Christopher, she soon learns of his past and sets out to confront Nikolas but can she survive it?

=== 2002 Midnight Predator ===
Turquoise Draka lives in a world of vampires and shapeshifters. She once had a normal teenage life - a family, friends. Everything was perfect until she was made a slave by a vampire. Now that she is an adult she is a vampire hunter who has been assigned to assassinate a cruel vampire by the name of Jeshikah by going undercover as a slave so she may enter the vampire realm, Midnight, undetected. Little does she know that her new owner, Jaguar, may hold the key to freeing her from her tormented past.

=== 2008 Persistence of Memory ===
Erin Misrahe is a sixteen-year-old girl with a deadly alter ego named Shevaun. Shevaun appears when Erin is severely stressed. Erin does not know that she is actually linked with a vampire and that the two switch bodies when Erin loses control, though neither can recall what happens during the episodes. Deciding to end this bond, Shevaun sets out to kill Erin.

=== 2010 Token of Darkness ===
After a car accident, Cooper Blake sees a ghost named Samantha, who wants more than ever to have her own body. Wanting to help her, Cooper sets out to find a way to help her get a body, not knowing that he will unlock the secrets of Samantha's past and put himself into grave danger.

=== 2011 All Just Glass ===
Taking place twenty-four hours after the events of Shattered Mirror, Sarah Vida's sister Adia is sent out by their mother to kill Sarah now that she is a vampire. Due to Sarah's transformation, a war has broken out between witch hunters and vampires and can only be ended by the death of Sarah. Adia, who has always been loyal to the laws of her line and made the family proud, sets out to find Sarah. Can she kill her own sister regardless of what she has become?

=== 2012 Poison Tree ===
Sarik is a tiger shapeshifter who is mediator at SingleEarth Haven Number Four. She accepted the position to help her escape her past. When a new mediator, Alysia, comes to join them, Sarik becomes suspicious. Sarik does not know that Alysia also has a past she is trying to run from. After an attack on Sarik's vampire lover, Jason, by a suspicious Onyx bounty hunter, the group is dragged into the middle of a disaster that leaves both Sarik and Alysia to decide what price must be paid to save the peaceful society that Haven Number Four stands for.

=== 2013 Promises to Keep ===
The novel was released on January 8, 2013 as part of "Den of Shadows".

== The Maeve’ra Trilogy ==
The Maeve’ra Trilogy is a trilogy of novels that take place before the events of Midnight Predator.

=== 2014 Bloodwitch ===
Released on May 13, 2014, the novel tells the story of Vance Ehecatl, a quetzal shapeshifter, who was raised by the vampires Jaguar and Taro in Midnight when he was abandoned as a baby. An act of violence forces him to leave his home. He meets Malachi Obsidian, another shapeshifter who is against Midnight and the vampires. Malachi claims Vance is a bloodwitch and that Jaguar, Taro and Mistress Jeshickah, the leader of Midnight, are trying to control him and use his powers. Vance does not believe him, but when illness starts to affect his friends, he realizes that his world is not as perfect as he thought. He must choose between the vampires who raised him or the shapeshifters who hate him.

=== 2015 Bloodkin ===
Bloodkin is the second novel in the Maeve’ra Trilogy and was released on April 14, 2015. The book follows 16-year-old Kadee Obsidian, a serpiente shape-shifter who has spent time with both the Serpiente and the Shantel after being taken from her human family as a sick child. Kadee and Vance, a quetzal shapeshifter who was first introduced in Bloodwitch, journey to the Shantel forest after learning that the Shantel are being held to account for the blood plague that infected Vance and others in Midnight. Among the Shantel with Vance, Kadee faces her and her guild's past, where her ideas of freedom and her knowledge of sins committed clash. When is it okay to go against one's principles? Do the ends justify the means? How much is one life worth, and when is the price too much to pay?

=== 2016 Bloodtraitor ===
Bloodtraitor is a novel in the Maeve’ra Trilogy that was set to be released in 2016.

== Omnibus ==
=== 2009 The Den of Shadows Quartet ===
The Den of Shadows Quartet is an omnibus consisting of the first four novels published by Amelia Atwater-Rhodes, In the Forests of the Night, Demon in My View, Shattered Mirror, and Midnight Predator. The omnibus was published on August 11, 2009.
