= Jasper Kent =

English author and composer

Jasper Kent (born 1968) is an English author and composer. As a composer his work is generally in the field of musical theatre and his novel series include the Danilov Quintet and the Charlie Woolf Mysteries.

== Biography ==
Born in Worcestershire, England, Jasper was educated at King Edward's School, Birmingham and read Natural Sciences (specializing in theoretical physics) at Trinity Hall, Cambridge. After graduating he worked as a software developer and consultant focusing on object-oriented languages such as C++ and C# and template metaprogramming. Notable clients have included Citigroup, Deloitte and Touche, BP, Hughes Aircraft and the UNICC. Jasper also provides training courses for Learning Tree International.

Kent has worked for almost twenty years in musical theatre as a singer, instrumentalist, musical director and composer. He has performed backing vocals for various artistes including Hinge and Bracket, Stig Rossen and Russell Watson and in the role of musical director has conducted, amongst others, Lucy Montgomery and Daniel Boys.

His four complete musicals are Writer's Cramp and Malvolio's Revenge (both written with Robert Renton) and The Promised Land and Remember! Remember! (with Robert Piatt and Robert Starr). The Promised Land was commissioned for and performed as part of the Jerusalem 3000 celebrations in 1996. Remember! Remember!, a musical dramatization of the events of the Gunpowder Plot of 1605, has been produced as a studio CD recording and was premiered in Lewes, Sussex, England in October 2008.

Jasper lives in the coastal Sussex town of Brighton.

== Novels ==
Jasper is best known as the author of Twelve, a supernatural historical thriller set during Napoleon’s invasion of Russia in 1812. The website Fantasy Book Review has ranked Twelve in sixth place in its list of all-time greatest historical fantasy novels. It has been translated into French, Polish, Italian and Turkish.

Twelve is the first novel in the Danilov Quintet, which spans Russian history from the French invasion of 1812 to the Russian Revolution of 1917. The second instalment, Thirteen Years Later, culminating in the Decembrist Uprising of 1825, was released in the UK in 2010, the third, The Third Section, in 2011 and the fourth, The People's Will, in 2013. The last book of the series, The Last Rite, was published in 2014.

Late Whitsun is the first Charlie Woolf Mystery, set in Brighton, England in 1938. It was published in 2016 and blends aspects of both murder mystery and espionage. Two further stories in the series have working titles of The Stalactite Man and To Muddy Death (a reference to the death of Ophelia in Hamlet).

Additionally, Jasper has written two as yet unpublished novels, Yours Etc., Mr Sunday, a murder mystery set in Brighton, and Sifr, a contemporary thriller encompassing cryptography and the discoveries of Roger Bacon.

== Published works ==
Books

The Danilov Quintet

- Twelve. Bantam Press. 2009. ISBN 978-0-593-06064-3.
- Thirteen Years Later. Bantam Press. 2010. ISBN 978-0-593-06065-0.
- The Third Section. Bantam Press. 2011. ISBN 978-0-593-06537-2.
- The People's Will. Bantam Press. 2013. ISBN 978-0-593-06954-7.
- The Last Rite. Bantam Press. 2014. ISBN 978-0-593-06955-4.

Charlie Woolf

- Kent, Jasper (2016). Late Whitsun. ISBN 978-1-537-73957-1.

Albums

- (2005) Remember! Remember! 2 Bob Productions.
