= Chloe Neill =

American novelist

- Born: May 17, 1975 (age 51); United States
- Writing career
- Language: English
- Period: 2009–present
- Genres: Romance; Urban Fantasy
- Notable work: Chicagoland Vampires
- Website: www.chloeneill.com

Chloe Neill (born May 17, 1975) is the New York Times and USA Today bestselling author of the Devil's Isle and Chicagoland Vampires series. She writes in the urban fantasy and paranormal romance genres.

== Life and career ==
Neill was born in Arkansas in 1975. She studied law at the University of Nebraska. When she was young Neill did not want to become a writer. During her school and college years, she decided not to choose a profession in which she would have to write too much. In an interview, she explained that at that time she was not good at constructing sentences and found it difficult to write. In a part-time job, which she did during her studies, she had to do journalistic activities and started to find it a lot easier to write. Finally, she began writing fan fiction, which she quickly gave up to invent her own characters and stories. In 2005 Neill wrote her first own story. Since that time she writes about two books each year. The most famous books are the novels from the Chicagoland Vampires series. In addition to the 13 novels in the series, Neill wrote an spin off of the series: The Heirs of Chicagoland. The first novel Wild Hunger was published in August 2018. The Chicagoland Vampires series has been translated into numerous languages, including Spanish, Italian and German.

Neill lives in Omaha along with her husband and two dogs. In addition to her work as an author, Neill works as a contract lawyer.

== Selected works ==
=== The Chicagoland Vampires series ===
1. Some Girls Bite, New American Library, (April 7, 2009) ISBN 0-451-22625-9
2. Friday Night Bites, New American Library, (October 6, 2009) ISBN 0-451-22793-X
3. Twice Bitten, New American Library, (July 6, 2010) ISBN 0-451-23064-7
4. Hard Bitten, New American Library, (May 3, 2011) ISBN 0-451-23332-8
5. Drink Deep, New American Library, (November 1, 2011) ISBN 0-451-23486-3
6. Biting Cold, New American Library, (August 7, 2012) ISBN 0-451-23701-3
7. House Rules, New American Library, (February 5, 2013) ISBN 0-451-23710-2
8. Biting Bad, New American Library, (August 6, 2013) ISBN 0-451-41518-3
9. Wild Things, New American Library, (February 4, 2014) ISBN 0-451-41519-1
10. Blood Games, New American Library, (August 5, 2014) ISBN 0-451-41520-5
11. Dark Debt, New American Library, (March 3, 2015) ISBN 0-451-47232-2
12. Midnight Marked, New American Library, (March 1, 2016) ISBN 0-451-47233-0
13. Blade Bound, New American Library, (April 25, 2017) ISBN 0451472349

Novella

- Tome 8,5 : High Stakes, (December 3, 2013) (Kicking It anthology)
- Tome 8,6 : Howling For You, (January 7, 2014) (eBook)
- Tome 10,5 : Lucky Break, (February 17, 2015) (eBook)
- Tome 12,5 : Phantom Kiss, (January 17, 2017) (eBook)
- Tome 13,5 : Slaying It, (July 17, 2018) (eBook)

=== The Heirs of Chicagoland series ===
1. Wild Hunger, (July, 2018)
2. Wicked Hour, (December, 2019)
3. Shadowed Steel, (May, 2021)
4. Devouring Darkness, (September, 2022)
5. Cold Curses, (November, 2023)

=== The Dark Elite series ===
1. Firespell, Signet Books, (January 5, 2010)
2. Hexbound, Signet Books, (January 4, 2011)
3. Charmfall, Signet Books, (January 3, 2012)

=== The Devil’s Isle series ===
1. The Veil, New American Library, (August 4, 2015)
2. The Sight, New American Library, (August 16, 2016)
3. The Hunt, New American Library, (September 26, 2017)
4. The Beyond, New American Library, (June 4, 2019)

=== The Captain Kit Brightling series ===
1. The Bright and Breaking Sea, Berkley, (November 17, 2020)
2. A Swift and Savage Tide, Berkley, (November 30, 2021)
