= Amelia Atwater-Rhodes =

American author of fantasy and young adult literature

- Born: Amelia Holt Atwater-Rhodes; April 16, 1984 (age 42); Silver Spring, Maryland, U.S.
- Occupations: Novelist, LA/LIT Teacher
- Spouse: Mandi McCrensky (m. 2010-2015; divorced)
- Children: 2
- Writing career
- Period: 1999–present
- Genre: Teen fiction
- Subjects: Vampire, shapeshifter, ghost, witch
- Notable works: The Den of Shadows Quartet, The Kiesha'ra Series, Return to Den of Shadows, The Maeve'ra Trilogy

Amelia Holt Atwater-Rhodes (born April 16, 1984), known professionally as Amelia Atwater-Rhodes, is an American author of fantasy and young adult literature and a Language Arts/Literature teacher.

She was born in Silver Spring, Maryland and has lived most of her life in Concord, Massachusetts. Her debut novel, In the Forests of the Night, was published in 1999, when she was fourteen years old. She has moved from her family's Sudbury home to a nearby Massachusetts town.

== 1999–2002: The Den of Shadows Quartet ==
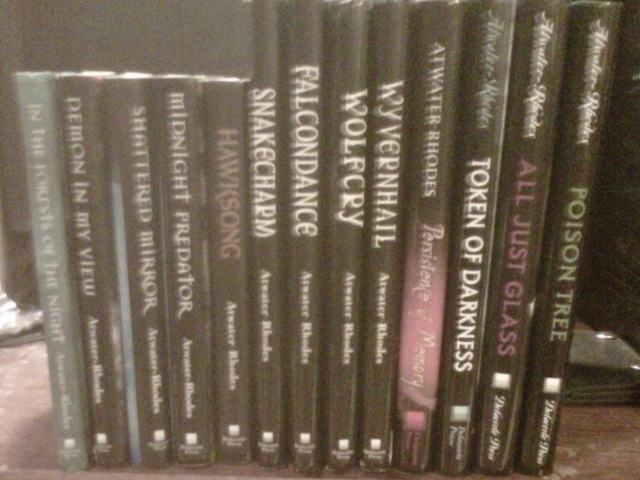
Amelia Atwater-Rhodes' novels from 1999 to 2012.

Atwater was born in 1984 to Susan Atwater-Rhodes, a vice principal of Acton-Boxborough Regional High School.

Atwater-Rhodes wrote her first novel at the age of thirteen, which earned her the title of "teen successor to Anne Rice." At the time, she said she had over a dozen stories in various stages sitting on her shelves.

In middle school, Atwater-Rhodes was questioned by an English teacher when a girl she knew proceeded to brag that Atwater-Rhodes was trying to get a book published. As it turns out, the English teacher was also a literary agent and asked to read some of her work. This teacher later represented Atwater-Rhodes.

She began writing her first novel, In the Forests of the Night, under the working title White Wine. On May 11, 1997, after her best friend, Jessica, had picked the William Blake poem, "The Tiger", the book's final title was derived. The first draft of the novel was completed in August of that year. During the writing process, Atwater-Rhodes suffered from a case of writer's block and a computer virus crashed her computer. Atwater-Rhodes spent the next four months revising the novel before she submitted the manuscript on December 31.

In mid-February 1998, Atwater-Rhodes met her agent, Tom Hart, and he would go on to contact her to announce that Random House had accepted her manuscript for publication. Hart also stated that it would be published on April 14, 1998, her fourteenth birthday. The novel, however, was not published until May 11, 1999, two years after she began working on the manuscript. The novel was written in first-person narrative, a feat she did not repeat in the three later novels. Hart stated that the novel was "the fastest sale [he] ever had."

In the Forests of the Night was a huge success, gaining the attention of millions of young readers. Atwater-Rhodes spent the year making appearances in magazines and on talk shows, including The Rosie O'Donnell Show. The novel was praised highly by critics such as Publishers Weekly who called it "Insightful...and imaginative". Also during the year Atwater-Rhodes was working on the follow-up to Forests called Demon in My View which was under the then working title Bitter Life. It was published in May 2000. The novel was well received by critics and was made an ALA Quick Pick for Young Adults.

Atwater-Rhodes graduated Concord-Carlisle High in 2001, a year early because she completed her junior and senior years simultaneously. In September 2001, she released her third novel, Shattered Mirror and in May 2002 she released her fourth novel, Midnight Predator. Both novels were made an ALA Quick Pick.

== 2003–2007: The Kiesha'ra Series ==
In 2003, Atwater-Rhodes, who so far had published novels about vampires, took a change of course and began a series of books based on a world of shapeshifters that she would call The Kiesha'ra Series. All the novels in the series are told in first-person narrative, a feat she had not done since her first novel. The first volume in the set of novels was released in July 2003, titled Hawksong. Despite the change in the subject topic the book was just as successful as her previous novels being made an ALA Quick Pick, it also won the School Library Journal Best Book of the Year, and was selected by Voice of Youth Advocates for their "Best Science Fiction, Fantasy, and Horror". Hawksong tells the story of a young woman named Danica Shardae, who is a princess and hawk shapeshifter of the Avian court, who also narrates the story. She tells of how all she has known all her life is war and all that she wants is to put an end to it.

The second novel in The Kiesha'ra Series, Snakecharm was released in September 2004. The novel is told by Danica's husband, Zane Cobriana, and continues where Hawksong left off. The third novel in the series, Falcondance was released in September 2005 and is told by Nicias Silvermead. The story takes place nineteen years after the events of Snakecharm.

The fourth novel in the series, Wolfcry was released in September 2006. The story is told by Oliza Shardae Cobriana, the daughter of Zane and Danica. The events tell the story of her struggle trying to maintain the peace that her parents had started but she is abducted and the journey takes her through a transformation which causes her to abdicate the throne of Wyvern's Court. The fifth and final novel in the Kiesha'ra series, Wyvernhail, was released in September 2007 and takes place shortly after the events of Wolfcry. The story is told by Hai and reveals everything that was hinted at in the prior novels. All the novels in the series were well received by critics with the School Library Journey calling Hawksong "A stunning adventure." and praising Falcondance as "Uniquely drawn and...vividly described". Voice of Youth Advocates called Snakecharm "Amazing." and praised Atwater-Rhodes' writing abilities in Wolfcry stating that she "is a fantastic storyteller." while calling Wyvernhail "Compelling and well-developed." Wolfcry was giving the IRA-CBC Young Adult's Choice.

== 2008–2013: Return to Den of Shadows ==
After completing The Kiesha'ra Series, Atwater-Rhodes released her tenth novel, Persistence of Memory on December 9, 2008. She later revealed that her first four novels and Persistence of Memory are part of the Den of Shadows. To mark this, her first four novels, In the Forests of the Night, Demon in My View, Shattered Mirror and Midnight Predator respectively, were re-issued with new cover art for the Den of Shadows and the same four novels were released in an omnibus called The Den of Shadows Quartet on August 11, 2009.

Taking a year off, she released her eleventh novel in February 2010 entitled Token of Darkness and it became the sixth novel in the Den of Shadows. She released the sequel to her 2001 novel, Shattered Mirror entitled All Just Glass in January 2011. The novel place twenty-four hours after the events in Shattered Mirror.

On July 10, 2012, she released her thirteenth novel entitled Poison Tree. Atwater-Rhodes revealed on her official website that her fourteenth novel, Promises to Keep which was released on March 12, 2013.

== 2014–2016: The Maeve'ra Trilogy & First Foray Into Adult Market ==
In February 2012, Atwater-Rhodes announced on her official forum that she had set a contract with Random House to publish a new series called The Maeve'ra Trilogy between 2014 and 2016. The titles were also announced in the same post. Three short stories, only available as E-Books, are also being released that are related to the series.

In March 2016, she announced that her first trilogy for adults had been purchased by Harper Voyage Impulse-part of HarperCollins. The first book in the Mancer trilogy Of the Abyss was released digitally on August 30, 2016 and the paperback is set to be released on November 1, 2016. This new trilogy has no direct ties to the Den of Shadows world but Atwater-Rhodes stated in her blog that "Message board veterans may even remember some drabbles and a Reality: Nyeusigrube appearance by Umber and Hansa, characters from the first novel, Of the Abyss."

== Personal life ==
Atwater-Rhodes attended University of Massachusetts Amherst and later graduated magna cum laude from the University of Massachusetts Boston with a double major in English and psychology. She attended Northeastern University for her MAT.

On February 26 and 27, 2009, she announced on her blog that she was engaged to her partner, Mandi McCrensky, of two years. The two were married on July 4, 2010 and were married for five years. On December 2, 2015, in a blog post, Atwater-Rhodes confirmed that the divorce became official on November 1, 2015. Amelia is now in a relationship with Shira Gaudet.

In 2013, Atwater-Rhodes converted to Judaism. She has two children.

== Appearances and awards ==
She has been featured in Seventeen, JUMP* Magazine, Entertainment Weekly, USA Today, The New Yorker, The Rosie O'Donnell Show and CBS This Morning. Several of her novels have been ALA Quick Picks for Young Adults; Hawksong was the School Library Journal Best Book of the Year, and Voice of Youth Advocates Best Science Fiction, Fantasy, and Horror Selection.

== Website ==
Atwater-Rhodes operates, codes, and participates actively in her own website.

A previous site, The Den of Shadows, became defunct in late 2015. The original name of the site, Nyeusigrube, translates in the language of her characters as "Den of Shadows". The former site had a large collection of information on her world, characters, books, a blog, and a message board with over 2,600 users and 12,700 articles (December 2010). However, as of December 2015, most of the site was inaccessible.

The new site was announced in a blog post and on her Facebook and Twitter accounts as a replacement for the old site, and includes a blog and, formerly, a message board.

== Common themes and traits ==
- The books often have misunderstood, quiet, lonesome protagonists who often have supernatural abilities along with a tough exterior and interior. (Demon in My View, Midnight Predator, Persistence of Memory)
- The protagonists are usually not pristine and clean of all evil traits. They usually have had difficult or unpredictable pasts. (Demon in My View, Midnight Predator, Falcondance, Wolfcry, Wyvernhail)
- The antagonists are often extremely violent, politically powerful, possess supernatural powers, think highly of themselves, and have "short fuses." A prime example of this would be Jeshickah from Midnight Predator or Fala from Demon in My View.
- Atwater-Rhodes often describes architecture and art in her work. (Wolfcry, Persistence of Memory)
- Characters are often nonchalant about death and usually end up in a complicated romance by the story's end. (Demon in My View, Shattered Mirror, Hawksong, Falcondance, Wolfcry, Persistence of Memory)

== Bibliography ==
=== Young adult ===
==== Den of Shadows ====
1. In the Forests of the Night (1999)
2. Demon in My View (2000)
3. Shattered Mirror (2001)
4. Midnight Predator (2002)
5. Persistence of Memory (2008)
6. Token of Darkness (2010)
7. All Just Glass (2011)
8. Poison Tree (2012)
9. Promises to Keep (2013)

===== Omnibus =====
- The Den of Shadows Quartet – Contains In the Forests of the Night, Demon in My View, Shattered Mirror, and Midnight Predator. (2009)

==== Kiesha'ra series ====
1. Hawksong (2003)
2. Snakecharm (2004)
3. Falcondance (2005)
4. Wolfcry (2006)
5. Wyvernhail (2007)

===== Omnibus =====
- The Shapeshifters: The Kiesha'ra of the Den of Shadows - Contains Hawksong, Snakecharm, Falcondance, Wolfcry, and Wyvernhail. (2010)

==== Maeve'ra Trilogy ====
1. Bloodwitch (2014)
2. Bloodkin (2015)
3. Bloodtraitor (2016)

===== Maeve'ra Trilogy short stories =====
- The Rebel (2015)
- The Prophet (2016)

=== Adult ===
==== Mancer Trilogy ====
1. Of the Abyss (2016)
2. Of the Divine (2016)
3. Of the Mortal Realm (2018)
