= Token of Darkness =

Novel by Amelia Atwater-Rhodes

- Author: Amelia Atwater-Rhodes
- Cover artist: Amanda Abram
- Language: English
- Series: Den of Shadows
- Genre: Gothic, Horror, Teen
- Publisher: Delacorte Press, a division of Random House
- Publication date: February 9, 2010
- Publication place: United States
- Media type: Print (hardback & paperback)
- Pages: 197 pp (first edition hardcover)
- ISBN: 978-0-385-73750-0
- Preceded by: Persistence of Memory
- Followed by: All Just Glass

Token of Darkness is the eleventh novel by American author, Amelia Atwater-Rhodes and is the sixth novel in the Den of Shadows. The novel was published on February 9, 2010. "The Raven" by Edgar Allan Poe is featured in the book.

== Summary ==
Cooper Blake is a high school football player who dreamed of going pro until a car accident that destroyed it all. Now he sees this ghost named Samantha, who wants a body. Intent on helping her Cooper goes to the library to find a way to help her. Along the way he meets Delilah and Brent, both who know of Samantha and realize the danger Cooper is in. Intent on helping him they must discover more about Samantha and where she came from, which puts all of them in more danger than they can handle.
