= Constantin Brâncoveanu University =

Private university in Bucharest, Romania, founded in 1991

Coordinates: 44.869968°N 24.859868°E

- Type: Private
- Established: 1991; 34 years ago
- Location: Pitești, Romania
- Website: www.univcb.ro

The Constantin Brâncoveanu University is a private university in Pitești, Romania, founded in 1991.
