= Midnight Predator =

Novel by Amelia Atwater-Rhodes

- 2002 cover
- Author: Amelia Atwater-Rhodes
- Cover artist: Cliff Nielsen
- Language: English
- Series: Den of Shadows
- Genre: Gothic, Horror, Vampire, Teen
- Publisher: Delacorte Press, a division of Random House
- Publication date: May 2002
- Publication place: United States
- Media type: Print (hardback & paperback)
- Pages: 248 pp (first edition hardcover)
- ISBN: 0-385-32794-3 (first edition hardcover)
- Preceded by: Shattered Mirror (2001)
- Followed by: Hawksong (2003)

Midnight Predator is a vampire novel written by Amelia Atwater-Rhodes, published in 2002 when the author was 18. The novel was an ALA Quick Pick and “a must-read” according to School Library Journal, who also wrote that “the plot and characters are so skillfully intertwined that each one moves the story to its thoughtful ending.” Fannie Heaslip Lea’s poem "The Dead Faith" appears in the beginning of the book.

== Summary ==
Turquoise Draka is a hunter who tracks targets for financial compensation. Her current assignment is the assassination of Jeshickah, a vampire. She was hired by an unidentified contact to complete the task. To reach the target, Draka must enter Midnight, a vampire realm, in the role of a human slave while concealing her abilities.
