= Shattered Mirror =

Novel by Amelia Atwater-Rhodes

- 2001 Cover
- Author: Amelia Atwater-Rhodes
- Cover artist: Phil Heffernan
- Language: English
- Series: Den of Shadows
- Genre: Gothic, Horror, Vampire, Teen
- Publisher: Delacorte Press, a division of Random House
- Publication date: September 2001
- Publication place: United States
- Media type: Print (hardback & paperback)
- Pages: 227 pp (first edition hardcover)
- ISBN: 0-385-32793-5 (first edition hardcover)
- Preceded by: Demon in My View (2000)
- Followed by: Midnight Predator (2002)

Shattered Mirror is a vampire novel written by Amelia Atwater-Rhodes, published in 2001 when the author was 17. W. B. Yeats’ poem "The Two Trees", which references broken glass, appears in the beginning of the book, and is the inspiration for the title. The main theme of the book is that the perceived heroes can sometimes be evil in their actions and the villains can sometime have good sides. It is a comment that things are not just one thing or the other, but mixed with qualities of all aspects of life.

The novel was an ALA Quick Pick and called “an action-packed thriller” by Booklist, who also wrote that Atwater-Rhodes "owns a readable prose style and a vivid imagination." School Library Journal said that “readers will be swept away by the seductive world of good and evil and find themselves lusting for a few more chapters.”

== Synopsis ==
The book is set in Acton, Massachusetts, the neighboring town to the author’s hometown of Concord, and follows the story of Sarah Tigress Vida, youngest daughter in a long line of vampire-hunting witches who see the world in a good-evil paradigm in which if you are not with them then you are against them. Her line of witches are the most powerful of the mortal vampire-hunting witches and are very attack oriented. In the hunt for Nikolas, a vampire that killed a Vida a century ago, Sarah finds Christopher and Nissa, sibling vampires who don’t kill when they need to feed. Instead, they feed on animals and willing humans. As Sarah’s friendship with Christopher begins to turn into something more, she is forbidden to see him by her domineering mother, Dominique. Ultimately, when Sarah discovers Christopher’s true identity and his tie to Nikolas, Sarah finds that she may have to re-think her attitude and her whole world view. After intense internal debate Sarah decides to reveal her identity to Christopher and a wall appears between them. This whole event finally garners her mother's attention and Sarah's mother binds her powers and calls a trial for Sarah's violations( which include associating with vampires and revealing her identity). She manages to escape with the help of her sister Adianna. Christopher's attitude towards her pushes her further into the Vida mind-set and she decides to hunt down Nikolas through Christopher. She gains an opportunity to kill Nikolas but hesitates when she thinks it is Christopher (as Nikolas and Christopher are twin brothers). Nikolas then over-powers Sarah and marks her. Sarah's pride is seriously injured and after an encounter with Christopher and a very traumatized victim of another vampire, Sarah receives an invitation from Nikolas to a party. Sarah decides to go against the warnings of Nissa and attends the party. There she attempts to fight Nikolas but without the full use of her bound powers she stands little chance. Adianna shows up and attempts to rescue Sarah but finds her-self unable to defeat Nikolas. Nikolas uses Adianna as a hostage for Sarah to surrender all her weapons (which are the only way for her to use her magic to kill vampires). Christopher shows up and attempts to talk them down but he eventually loses control due to Sarah's attempts to fight back and he begins fighting Sarah as well. Christopher and his brother overpower Sarah and attempt to blood-bond her to them. However, Sarah's witch blood rejects the vampires' blood and Adianna, her older sister, tells them it will kill her. Christopher is in love with Sarah and can't bear what he's done. In the end, he turns her into a vampire and asks her to live with them, because he loves her. Sarah accepts to stay a vampire, but says that she isn't ready to be with them yet. She refuses to stay with them because she can't follow their trail of killing people every time she feeds. Sarah resolves to find a way for herself to live her life.

== Characters ==
Sarah Tigress Vida: The book is mainly written from Sarah's point of view. Sarah is the second daughter of Dominique Vida and is a Macht witch. The Vida line specializes in offensive magic skills and physical combat for the purpose of hunting vampires. Her father, a human vampire hunter, was killed when Sarah was six years old. She was the one who discovered his body on the porch. Her mother is currently the best vampire hunter in the world and is extremely strict. Sarah was raised from a very young age to kill vampires, however she has problems staying unemotional. At the start of the book, she was just forced to transfer to a new school by her mother.

Christopher Ravena: Christopher was actually born around 1830 but was turned into a vampire by his twin brother, Nicolas. After that, they changed their names to 'Kristopher' and 'Nikolas'. They terrorized the world with their killings and became notorious by killing Elisabeth Vida, a Vida witch. He and Kristopher are also known for carving their names into the skin of their victims and bloodbonds (humans bounded to a vampire). After about a hundred years, he stopped his violent life-style when Nissa begged him for help. Since then, he's lived with peaceful lifestyle with Nissa but still keeps in contact with Nikolas. He also changed the spelling of his name back to 'Christopher'. Because of his long absence from killing, most vampire hunters have forgotten about Kristopher and only blame Nikolas for the various killings, including Elisabeth Vida. At the start of the book, Christopher is attending the same school as Sarah. At first she attempts to ignore Christopher but he is very charming and he wins her over. Christopher has blue cone monochromacy.

Nikolas Ravena: Nikolas is Christopher's twin brother. He was born around 1830 as Nicolas, but was turned into a vampire by his sister, Nissa, after he murdered a girl named Christine. Afterwards, he turns his twin brother, Christopher, into a vampire and they change their names to 'Nikolas' and 'Kristopher'. They terrorize the world with their killings and became notorious by killing Elisabeth Vida, a witch. He and Kristopher are also known for carving their names into the skin of their victims and bloodbonds (humans bounded to a vampire). After about a hundred years, Kristopher decided to live a more peaceful lifestyle. Nikolas tried to follow, but he was unable keep himself from feeding off and killing humans. Because of Kristopher's long absence from killing, most vampire hunters have forgotten about Kristopher and only blame Nikolas for the various killings, including Elisabeth Vida. However, his power and skill have allowed him to evade the hunters for generations. He is very fond of everything being black and white. All of his houses are decorated completely black and white and he only wears those colors.

Dominique Vida: Dominique is Sarah's mother and the head of the Vida clan of Macht witches. She is a renowned vampire hunter feared by vampires and other hunters alike. She is extremely strict and advocates emotionless and battle-ready behaviors. Dominique also appears in the novel Demon in My View.

Adianna Vida: Adianna is Sarah's older sister. She looks out for Sarah and Sarah considers her to be the better Daughter of Vida.

Caryn Smoke: Caryn is a witch from the Smoke Clan of Macht witches. Smoke witches are powerful healers and they do not fight or hunt vampires. Caryn belongs to a group known as Single-Earth which is a peaceful collective of vampires, witches, shape-shifters and humans. Caryn also appears in the novel Demon in My View.

Kaleo: Kaleo is one of the eldest vampire that hunters have been trying to kill and is a direct fledgling of Kendra. He was attracted to Nissa and wanted to turn her into a vampire. After she refused, Kaleo killed Nissa's father in front of Nicholas and threatened to kill Nicholas if Nissa wouldn't allow him to turn her. Over his long lifespan, he's made many fledglings from women he was attracted to. He also has many bloodbonds (humans bounded to a vampire), including his favorite, Heather, who he's had for three hundred years. Kaleo enjoys bright colors, especially bright red.

Nissa Ravena: Nissa is Christopher's and Nicholas's older sister. She was born around 1830 in the southern US. She is a talented artist, which attracted Kaleo to her. She was also attracted Kaleo but refused to be turned into a vampire. After Kaleo killed Nissa's father and threatened to kill Nicholas, Nissa agreed to being turned. Several years later, she turned Nicholas, who turned Christopher a day later. Nissa has always lived a peaceful lifestyle. Though she feeds on humans, she doesn't kill them. At the start of the book, she is attending the same school as Sarah.

Robert Richards: Robert is a human attending the same school as Sarah, Christopher, and Nissa. After his sister, Christine, is injured, physically and mentally, by vampires, Robert attempts to become a vampire hunter. He believes that Nikolas is the one responsible for Christine's injures.

Christine Richards: Christine is a human and the older sister to Robert. She was accidentally brought to a vampire bash by Heather, Kaleo's bloodbond (human bounded to a vampire). Nikolas liked her and drank blood from her. He carved his name into her arm, however, using vampiric powers, Christine felt no pain. When she told Nikolas that her name is Christine, he got upset because it reminded him of the girl with the same name that he had killed as a human. Nikolas wanted to keep Christine as a bloodbond but she said she had to return to her brother. At the point, Nikolas got angry because humans with a family aren't supposed to be invited to a vampire bash, and told Kaleo to get rid of her. Kaleo drank her blood, injured her, bloodbonded her, and left her in a middle of a front yard, all without Nikolas's knowledge. The authorities all assumed that Nikolas was the one who injured her because his name was carved into her arm. Because of this experience and Kaleo continuing to secretly drink blood from her, Christine is mentally scarred. She hates colors, particularly red. She color everything in her room black and white, Nikolas's colors. She refuses to be called Christine, instead going by Kristin. Seeking revenge, her younger brother, Robert, attempts to become a vampire hunter.

== Sequel ==
All Just Glass released on January 11, 2011 is a follow-up to Shattered Mirror. The events in All Just Glass take place twenty-four hours after the events of Shattered Mirror and introduce new characters to the plot.
