= Cliff Nielsen =

American artist

- Education: Art Center College of Design
- Known for: Illustration
- Awards: Society of Illustrators, Spectrum

Cliff Nielsen is an American book illustrator and comic book artist. The Internet Speculative Fiction Database credits him with cover art for about 500 book and magazine covers published since 1994. Nielsen is best known for his work on projects such as Star Wars, The X-Files, and The Chronicles of Narnia, among work in advertising campaigns, designs, and magazines. His illustrations have been recognized for their excellence by the Society of Illustrators, Print, and Spectrum, among others. Feature articles focusing on his work appear in design publications and fanzines. Nielsen has been an international speaker on digital art, and has served as a judge for the Society of Illustrators and a variety of professional illustration award programs. He lives in Los Angeles, California.

In 1995, Nielsen and his then-wife Terese collaborated on Ruins, a Marvel Comics mini-series, wherein he produced more than just the cover art..

Nielsen has also worked on art for the Magic: The Gathering collectible card game, and created some covers for the magazine Carpe Noctem, an issue of which featured an interview with him. He has shown his work on a graphic novel entitled Beloved at ComicCon.

== Work ==
Nielsen's works are primarily created digitally. He has illustrated the covers of several books, including:

- The Giver
- The Chronicles of Narnia
- Star Wars
- Star Trek
- Wrinkle in Time
- The Dark Tower series
- The Mortal Instruments
- The Infernal Devices
- Shadowhunter Academy
- Cirque Du Freak
- Heir Apparent
- Ranger's Apprentice
- The Inheritance Trilogy
- Tiger's Curse series
- Blood and Chocolate
- Demon in My View
- Midnight Predator
- Royal Street
- Kiesha'ra Series
- The Chronicles of Faerie
- Buffy the Vampire Faerie
- Jane Yellowrock Series
- Touching Spirit Bear
- The Last Hours

== Bibliography ==
- The Other Wind (2001) (Written and Illustrated by Ursula K. Le Guin)
