= The Kiesha'ra Series =

Set of five fantasy novels Amelia Atwater-Rhodes

The Kiesha'ra Series is a set of five fantasy novels written by American young adult author Amelia Atwater-Rhodes, which focus on several races of shapeshifters, including the avians (bird people), the serpiente (snake people), and the shm'Ahnmik (falcon people). The series includes the following novels: Hawksong (2003), Snakecharm (2004), Falcondance (2005), Wolfcry (2006), and Wyvernhail (2007).

The series title, which is in a language from the series called ha'Shmla, translates as "Children of Kiesha." Kiesha is the first cobra serpiente, from whom the royal line of the Cobriana descends.

== Novels ==
=== Hawksong (2003) ===
"Danica Shardae, an avian shapeshifter, will do anything in her power to stop the war that has raged between her people and the serpiente - even pretend to be in love with Zane Cobriana, the terrifying leader of her kind's greatest enemy, and accept him as her pair bond. But will Zane strike as swiftly and lethally as the cobra that is his second form?"

There has been a war raging between the avian shapeshifters – humans that can turn into sparrows, hawks, crows and raves – and the serpiente – humans that can turn into vipers, cobras, mambas, boas and pythons. No one knows how the war really started. The avians claim that the first cobra, Kiesha, stabbed the first hawk, Alasdair, in the back. The serpents claim that Alasdair had her people slaughter all seven of the first serpents. The war started and has been going strong for thousands of years.

Danica Shardae is born into this war and wishes for peace. Heir to the avian throne, she wants to live in a world where she can raise children without fear of them dying, like her brother and sister had. Zane Cobriana, heir to the serpiente throne, wants the same. He sends a message to the avians, asking to meet and discuss peace in a neutral territory - that of the tiger shapeshifters, Mistari.

The Mistari leaders tell the two groups that the only way to peace is to combine the two royal houses. Danica and Zane must wed and hope that their union can bring the two people together. The idea is dismissed almost immediately, but later, in private, Danica and Zane agree to try.

Traveling between the two lands, the couple must learn to adapt to different ways of thinking and acting. The avians view the casual touching of the serpiente as scandalous, while the serpents view the emotionless reserve of the avians as cold and soulless. After pushing through the troubles of bringing the two groups together and surviving assassination attempts by their own trusted guards, Danica and Zane grow closer, until the one who they each used to despise was now the one they could never live without.

=== Snakecharm (2004) ===
Zane Cobriana, a cobra shapeshifter, his hawk pair bond, and the peace their union has brought to the avian and serpiente. Soon, Danica (Zane Cobriana's child) will have a child to carry on their royal line.

Syfka, an ancient falcon, has arrived from Ahnmik claiming that one of her people is hidden in their midst. The falcons are more powerful than the avians and serpiente combined, and Syfka shows nothing but contempt for Zane and Danica's alliance. To Zane's horror, his own people seem just as appalled as Syfka is by the thought of a mixed-blood child becoming heir to the throne.

Is Syfka's lost falcon just a ruse to stir up controversy among them? The truth lies somewhere in their tangled pasts and the search will redefine Zane and Danica's fragile future.

=== Falcondance (2005) ===
"Nicias is a falcon, the son of two exiles from Ahnmik and images of this distant island have always haunted his dreams. When his visions become more like reality, his parents send him back to his homeland - and a royal falcon - they've tried their best to forget."

Nicias Silvermead is a peregrine falcon born and raised in Wyvern's Court, the son of Kel and Sebastian, who had been hidden in the sparrow form of Erica Silvermead and the crow form of Andreios. When his falcon magic awakens, he travels to the white city of Ahnmik, nestled days out to sea on an island, to learn to control his power. Ahnmik is not like Wyvern's Court. There is magic embedded everywhere. The roads can take you somewhere you didn't expect to go, the towers sing an unearthly song, and the dancers can call rain or see the future. But this city is ruled with the iron fist of Empress Cjarsa and her heir, Araceli, who happens to be Nicias's grandmother. The slightest criticism of the government is treason, punishable with the Empress's Mercy, the best and cruelest falcon fighters. Plots and deceptions are everywhere. Nicias finds himself a pawn in these mind games and does not enjoy it.

While in Ahnmik, Nicias meets Darien, his mother's former partner in the Empress's Mercy, supposedly lost to Ecl, the realm of nothingness where any falcon can escape the pain of reality, sometimes of their own volition, but sometimes not. Darien teaches Nicias how to swim in Ecl and Nicias meets Hai, born of Darien and Anjay Cobriana, Zane Cobriana's older brother. Half falcon and half cobra, Hai's magic was uncontrollable, and in a bad episode, she fell and broke her wings. Now grounded and lost in Ecl, she wants to be left alone. But Nicias is determined to bring her back to the real world.

Darien manages to recover her position in the Mercy while spiriting away Nicias and Hai, back to Wyvern's Court. Nicias returns to Ahnmik to convince Aracelli to let him go for good and is caught in a plot by Syfka to kill Empress Cjarsa. Once Aracelli and Cjarsa stop Syfka, Aracelli grants Nicias the freedom to come and go as he pleases.

Returning to Wyvern's Court, Nicias finds that the once comatose Hai has awoken, thanks to the bond he formed with her while in Ecl.

=== Wolfcry (2006) ===
"Oliza Shardae Cobriana is heir to Wyvern's Court, home of the avians and serpiente, whose war with each other ended just before Oliza was born. But hatred is slow to die, and Oliza's serpiente suitor is found beaten in avian land. How can she be expected to lead a unified society if her people still cannot live peacefully together?"

Oliza is half hawk, half cobra and can transform into a mix of both - a wyvern. She represents the blending of both societies, loving the avian music and simplicity and the serpiente dancers and freedom. She loves her home, Wyvern's Court, but it is clear that this world is still torn apart by prejudice. Oliza has to choose a mate, but either choice - avian or serpent - may result in civil war. After one of her suitors is found beaten almost to death, she realizes how far her people still have to go. However, before she can do anything, she is kidnapped by a group of lion mercenaries and carried far north, weeks away from her home.

The wyvern's journey back is fraught with hardship. Along the way, she meets Betia, a wolf shapeshifter who helps her on her way back. She also stumbles upon the Obsidian guild, a group of criminals and dancers that mostly consist of the white vipers that were, long ago, banned from the serpiente lands, though the ban was lifted years ago. When Oliza returns to Wyvern's Court, she discovers that, while speaking with Hai, she was granted a glimpse of possible futures. In the futures that she ruled, Wyvern's Court was destroyed, people murdered, and Oliza realizes she cannot rule, not if she wants her home to flourish.

Oliza puts her cousin, Salem Cobriana, on the serpiente throne and her aunt (though only two years younger than Oliza), Sive Shardae, on the avian throne. She then leaves with her new mate, Betia, for the Obsidian guild.

=== Wyvernhail (2007) ===
Narrated by em'Ecl'la'Hai, mongrel falcon, child of Anjay Cobriana and shm'Ahnmik'la'Darien. The book begins only moments after the end of Wolfcry.When Oliza abdicates the throne of Wyverns Court all Hai sees in her sakkri'a'she('vision of the future' in the ancient language) is fire and destruction of Wyvern's Court. In this final book, Hai has to fight to preserve peace and protect people of Wyvern's Court.

== Omnibus ==
=== 2010 The Shapeshifters: The Kiesha'ra of the Den of Shadows ===
The Shapeshifters: The Kiesha'ra of the Den of Shadows is an omnibus consisting of all five novels in "The Kiesha'ra Series". It was published on January 12, 2010.

== The People ==
=== Dasi ===
The three lines of shapeshifters that are the focus of the series are either direct or indirect descendants of the Dasi, an ancient Egyptian cult. The thirteen Dasi worshipped eight gods, primarily the dual powers of Ahnmik and Anhamirak. Eight of the Dasi worshipped Anhamirak and the four other gods who had similar power to her, while four served Ahnmik and his two divine companions. Ahnmik is the god of control, power, manipulation, cold, sleep, silence, and peace. His gifts to the world included bondage and mastery, and his high priestess was Cjarsa, who was aided by Araceli. The other gods on his side of the pantheon were the death goddess Brysh (whose priestess was Syfka) and the void goddess Ecl (whose priest was Servos). Anhamirak is the goddess of fire, love, life, beauty, passion, chaos, and destruction but above all, freedom. The only other named deity on the light side of the pantheon is Anhamirak's son Namid, god of life and patron of the priest Brassal. The head of the Dasi was Maeve, and it was her task to maintain balance between the two sides.

The lesser priests and priestesses of the Dasi were called the Nesera'rsh and the Ealla'rsh. They served Anhamirak and Ahnmik respectively and were known collectively as the Rsh. They spoke to the people whereas the thirteen Dasi leaders spoke to the gods. They made sure that all opinions were acknowledged, served as healers and judges, and taught the people about Ahnleh ("fate" in the Dasi language). It is unknown if Ahnleh was considered an actual deity or a universal force, despite being referred to as feminine. Each Rsh enclave was "a realm unto itself," and its members were dealt with by the Rsh and the Rsh alone. The Dasi themselves respected this fact, and those who remain still do, recognizing the Serpiente Dancer's Guild (namely the sha'Mehay nest within the serpiente palace city and the Obsidian Guild of white vipers) as having originated from the Nesera'rsh. Dancers wearing coins marked with the ha'Shmla symbol Ahnleh (now known colloquially among serpiente as the Snakecharm) are not to be attacked, even by members of the falcon royal family. The falcon Mercy is technically the modern equivalent of the Ealla'rsh, but they have pledged their service to the falcons of the royal family and relinquish their immunity to the will of the royals. However, they still deal with their members internally.

One day a creature named Leben approached Maeve and asked her to worship him. She knew that doing so would destroy the balance but she was afraid to refuse as Leben was very powerful. So she seduced him and he gave her the second form of a white viper. She also begged him grant her people of the Dasi second forms. Kiesha and her followers were given forms of snakes while falcon forms were given to Cjarsa and the other worshippers of Ahnmik. Eventually Anhamirak's followers drove the falcons out thus the balance was destroyed. Soon after, a rift between Maeve and the other serpents developed, and she was driven out for practicing black magic. The reasons for this are discussed more closely in Wolfcry.

Kiesha rose to power of the new serpiente people and Maeve was taken in by the Nesera'rsh. Kiesha's son, Diente, became the first of the royal Cobriana line and the serpent title for king comes from his name. Maeve live among the Nesera'rsh and had children who survived to become the majority of the Obsidian Guild. The four priest of Ahnmik are all still alive as the falcon royal family, though their situation is slightly changed in Falcondance. They inhabit an island city that shares its name with their god and which they rarely leave.

It is revealed throughout the books that the falcons began the war between the serpiente and the avians. After Maeve left, all the Dasi lost control of their power. While the falcon's power would eventually balance itself by consuming those who were to weak or too strong in a coma-like madness, Kiesha's power continued to rage. It was said that she could kill just by looking at another, that her eyes could kindle fire, and her dance, which once brought rains to fertilize the crops, would instead cause floods and kill hundreds of people. The falcons then decided that to protect their people her magic must be split. So they found a small girl named Alasdair and gave her the form of a hawk. Then they split Kiesha's power and gave half of it to Alasdair. They then raised Alasdair to be the ruler of the avians. Later on, she was introduced to a Kiesha and the seven other Anhamirak-worshipping members of the Dasi, and through falcon magic, the serpiente murdered Alasdair. The hawk's people were so distraught that they killed the eight serpents and began the centuries-long war between the two species. All this was put in place so that the magic of the two people could not be united, and again bring about unimaginable destruction akin to that of Kiesha in the days of the Dasi.

=== Avians ===
Avians possess extremely efficient respiratory systems, with body temperatures much higher than those of ordinary humans. Their hearts beat at close to a hundred times per minute at rest. The magic that allows avians to shapeshift protects them from plagues and weaknesses that would kill a human. They are also rumored to be able to live for five hundred years or more. However, this has not been proven in recent years due to the constant killing of the Avian-Serpiente War. Most have either dark hair and eyes, and possess the second form of ravens, crows, and sparrows. They are descended from the tribal leaders of the people who became the avians, their ancestors being Sybil, Merle, and Kyne, respectively. The Avian ambassador to the Mistari takes the form of a goshawk, which appears to be unique. The exception is the royal family, whose members take the forms of golden hawks. Their human forms have golden hair and eyes. These traits breed true over any other type of avian, so any child of a royal family member will have them despite their non-royal parent's lineage. Hawks also have tendency to produce girls when bearing children. All avians are capable of assuming a Demi form where they retain human shape while sprouting their avian wings.

The monarchy is descended through the maternal line, or through the Queen, who is known as the "Tuuli Thea". Customarily the reign of the Tuuli Thea ends when her eldest daughter becomes pregnant, thus ensuring continuation of the line. The Tuuli Thea's consort does not receive a title; all avian husbands are referred to as an alistair (meaning "protector"), though a spouse of either gender is called a pair bond. Any other members of the royal family who have a hawk form are addressed formally by their family name, Shardae. First and nicknames are used only by close friends or family in private. Although the Avian society is matriarchal, men are expected to protect and honor their female counterparts. Couples are irrevocably promised to each other as children; the male, or alistair, is a constant protective presence in his betrothed's life.

As seen in the traditional betrothal system, Avian culture is quite conservative. Everything is dictated by tradition, with an emphasis on respect to one's elders. Socially, avians severely repress their emotions, neither laughing nor crying publicly. This control is dubbed "avian reserve", a term coined by other shapeshifter tribes. Couples grow to be close, but refrain from sexual activity until formally wed. Avians cherish music, art, and storytelling despite its decline due to the war with the serpiente.

The highest punishment among avians is to clip one's wings. The offenders flight feathers are cut and a poison is used to force them into human form. The offender can no longer access his second shape or Demi form, and trying to causes great pain. Only force-shifting, an advanced and invasive magical technique that only falcons know how to use, can reverse the damage.

The avians and serpiente have warred for thousands of years. At the start of the series in Hawksong, the royal families of both sides have been nearly decimated while their respective societies and cultures slip further and further into decay.

=== Serpiente ===
The serpiente could not be more different from the avians. They wear their emotions openly, even in some situations where a little control might be appropriate, and are much more free-thinking than the avians. Most anything is allowed in serpiente society as long as it doesn't harm anyone. Rape is considered the highest crime, the punishment being death without a trial, the rationalization being that it is better to kill an innocent man than to let a guilty one go. As worshippers of Anhamirak, the serpiente value free choice above virtually everything else. Ordinary serpiente who follow the Cobriana line consist of emerald boas (descendants of the Dasi Danuta), pythons (Brassal), vipers (Isadora), black rats (Landon), red rats (Nalini), taipans (Donte), and mambas (Nikhil). Though the white vipers are also serpiente, they are descendants of Maeve, the high priestess who originally stood above Kiesha, and they refuse to acknowledge a cobra as their ruler. The royal line of the serpiente are the Cobriana, cobra shapeshifters and the descendants of Kiesha. Falcons refer to them in the ancient languages of ha'Shmla or ha'Dasi as the Kiesha'ra ("the Children of Kiesha"). The ruler is called the Diente and their husband or wife (referred to as "mate" in serpiente society) is called Nag (male) or Naga (female). The first prince in line for the throne is called the Arami. Unlike avians, serpiente frequently have relationships before getting married and when they do marry they choose their own mate. Serpiente culture highly values dancing as well as music and art. The dancer's guilds are, in fact, a power of their own and though they are loyal to the Cobriana, the Diente's power over them is only minimal. Serpiente are very social and are always surrounded by other children while growing up, even when sleeping. This need for company continues throughout their adult lives.

Serpiente are cold-blooded even in human form and as such their body temperature is usually near room temperature. Their Demi forms allow them to see heat. This allows them to see and distinguish avians even when they are hiding due to their high body heat. Serpiente are basically invisible to this type of vision and are only recognizable by scent, another sense that is enhanced. The magic that allows serpiente to shapeshift protects them from plagues and weaknesses that would kill a human. They are also rumored to be able to live for five hundred years or more. However, this has not been proven in recent years due to the constant killing of the Avian-Serpiente War. Ordinary serpents have hair in various shades of anything varying from light, honey brown to black. Their eye color can consist of varying jewel tones including amber, sapphire, and emerald. White vipers, who are much less common being descended from a formerly exiled group of Serpiente, are known for white-blonde hair and blue eyes. The Cobriana family are known for their black hair and garnet colored eyes, which can hypnotise with a glance. Cobra traits breed true over any other serpiente traits, excepting the white vipers. All serpents can assume a Demi form which consists of their eyes becoming more brightly colored and the pupils turning into slits. They also grow fangs and snake skin. Their demi-form is less poisonous than their second form, so if bitten, the victim dies slower and more painfully. Serpiente children are born able to take their serpent form, though they don't have much control over it for the first several months and their poison does not develop for four or five years. Serpiente are not completely immune to their own venom, but have a high tolerance to all natural venoms, keeping childish tantrums from being deadly.

Serpiente are able to create hybrids with both avians and falcons. However, due to the differing magics between the two races involved and the falcons hatred for mixed-bloods even between members of their own race, the children of such unions are at war with themselves and barely tolerated by their own people. The union between serpiente and avian is much more successful, resulting in a child with five forms (two full forms for avian and serpent forms, a Demi form that blends bird, snake, and human, a human form, and a blend of bird and snake referred to as a wyvern).

The serpiente have been at war with the avians for thousands of years and the two sides have been slaughtering each other frequently and very efficiently. Nobody, save the original falcons of the Dasi, remembers how or why the fighting began

=== Falcons (shm'Ahnmik) ===
The falcons are introduced in the second book of the series, Snakecharm and are discussed in detail in the third book, Falcondance. Unlike the avians and the serpiente, who have forgotten much of their origins and all of their magic, the falcon culture has changed very little since the days after the Dasi split, to the point that they speak ha'Dasi (a variation of the Dasi's language ha'Shmla) in everyday life. Ha'Dasi is easily picked up by falcons who have spoken it only sparingly before, since it is the language of the gods and is literally a part of every falcon due to their magic. The falcons inhabit an island, which is called Ahnmik. They have their own city, which is every bit as magical as the falcons themselves. Falcon society has a strict hierarchy with even more rules than the avians. Cjarsa is the Empress and together with her heir Araceli she holds complete control of all the falcons. Implying that the royal family is anything but just, flawless, and merciful is treason and punished with death by torture. As saying that the royal family tortures anyone would be implying that they are cruel, any torture is referred to as the Empress' or the Heir's mercy. The Mercy is also the name of the local police force, which does anything the royal family orders them to, be it helping a child in need or torturing someone to death. They work in pairs, and met out punishment to other members of the Mercy when it is required. When one member feels pain, all of them do. Falcons are deadly fighters, both physically and magically, and resistance to their rules or sentences will almost certainly result in death. In spite of their strict social hierarchy, falcons act much more like serpiente than avians because of their similar origins. Falcons value dance and music and every single thing they build is a work of art.

Though most falcons have a free choice of mate, they are confined to falcons of the same type as they are. Falcon children are rare, and precious, and each falcon when born causes a shift in their magic, which all falcons can feel. While children between different falcon types are more easily conceived, they often born with warped magic that usually ends up destroying both them and everything around them. Those that do not have warped magic have no magic at all. They are called kajaes, and in a culture where magic is as common as breathing, they are considered freaks, especially since they would have no wings. Children between falcons and other species are forbidden as the resulting child will have unbalanced magic. Falcon-serpent cross-breeds in particular are said to be unbalanced because the volatile nature of serpent magic 'burns' the calm falcon half. It is likely that the same is true of avian-falcon hybrids, since Avians hold the other half of the magic the Serpiente originally commanded. Mixed-bloods are commonly called mongrels, or quemak in ha'Dasi.

Falcons begin studying combat as soon as they are able to walk. They usually begin studying their magic (called jaes'Ahnmik in ha'Dasi) almost as quickly. At the age of four years, they are first tested for their magic, being required to stand for a fortnight without food or drink to test their ability to use magic to sustain themselves without letting it control them. Those who have not come into their magic by the end of their first decade are likely kajaes.

A very common form of falcon magic is casting powerful illusions, but more advanced techniques cover a broad range of abilities. Mindwalking is the ability to enter another person's mind as if it were another dimension. Falcons are able to heal grievous wounds, be they internal or external. Persuasion spells can be cast to enhance a particular desire and reduce other beliefs that would keep the subject from acting on the desire. Force-changing is a particularly difficult skill to master, allowing the user to manipulate another shapeshifter's magic to shift them from one form to another. It can be used to heal wounds and cure poisons, but because it is essentially the manipulation of a person's essence, it is considered incredibly invasive and is not allowed to be used by anyone except in an emergency. The only people purposely taught this skill are the Mercy. Because the user was immersed in the magic of another shapeshifter, they gain vary degrees of ability to take that users form. If used deeply enough (usually in an unsuccessful attempt to save someone), the falcon can fully take all forms of their target (human, Demi, and animal). The gift that is most prized by the Empress is sakkri weaving. Sakkri are dances that shape magic. They can be used for entertainment to evoke true emotion or physical feelings like rain or for more serious magics like creating visions of the past or future. It can take falcons centuries to master sakkri weaving well enough to join elite dancing choirs. There are also various battle magics, usually involving tangible indigo energy.

Jaes'Ahnmik does not lend itself to matters of procreation. Falcons rarely have children because of it, and if it is used to heal on another species it has a high risk of making females unable to bear children. Their magic also forces them to tell the truth in all things. According to the old myths, "Ahnmik turns all vows true, all lies apparent, and the written word as blood in stone." This means that falcons cannot even make white lies for the comfort of others, possibly at the risk of their lives.

All of their training is done in an effort to balance their magic. Falcons who are too weak to control their magic or whose magic is too strong to control fall to the goddess Ecl. Ecl is described by Servos as a void of nothingness, everything that never was and never can be. Her world (called Ecl'gah, which means illusion) often appears as a plain of black ice under a silver moon. It is somewhat akin to the dreamworld, being manipulated by the "dreamers" within it. It can show those who 'ride' the Ecl the past, the present, and possible futures, and those who enter it willingly and with no demands for the Ecl cannot be taken by it. This allows them to use their magic without fear, and bear the title "Mana'Ecl." Those who enter looking for its ability to numb them owe the Ecl, and she takes it by leaving them in a dreamlike coma. They are then known as shm'Ecl. They are between life and death, usually still, but occasionally lashing out with magic at the nightmares they see. The pain of coming closer to reality usually drives them deeper into Ecl, ever more unlikely to return. Shm'Ecl can sometimes sense those of royal blood despite their state, and since some have purposely fled into Ecl to be numbed to the pain of the world, they are not always pleased to be awakened. The only way to pull oneself out of Ecl is to have worldly bonds and vows to call you back. This includes things like vows to spouses, partners, or monarchs. Falcons with great skill in mindwalking could technically help the shm'Ecl, but the few with that kind of power are needed for more important tasks.

The falcons (namely Araceli) developed a poison called am'haj that is deadly to the serpiente and traded large amounts of it to the avians. It kindles the remaining spark of Anhamirak magic within a serpent into a fire that destroys itself. Without their magic, the serpiente die. It can be diluted, but in its pure forms even a small scratch will knock a serpiente unconscious in a few seconds, and if it is powerful enough to knock them unconscious then it will eventually kill them. When a cobra is killed by am'haj, the garnet coloring leaves their eyes, leaving a more natural tone. It is assumed that this would hold true for other serpiente, whose jewel-toned eyes are just as unnatural.

Falcon hierarchy divides them up into several classes with strict bordering lines between them. The classes are usually defined by a person's ability to control their magic or by their origin. There are four types of falcons, each of them is led by the member of the royal family they are descendants of: Gyrfalcon (Cjarsa), Peregrine (Araceli), Aplomado (Syfka), and Merlin (Servos). Cjarsa and Araceli rule the island, Syfka is the falcon's representative to the mainland, and Servos is in charge of the shm'Ecl. Pure Diamond falcons come into their magic too early, which is dangerous considering how early falcon children already begin training shortly their training. They are often mentally disturbed and either the Empress or her heir must bind their magic. Cjarsa requires them to remain on the ground so that it is easier to reach them if they have an episode. They cannot disobey or lie to members of the royal family, and so serve as more common guards than the Mercy. Their ability to see through any magic except that of a royal falcons is very useful.

Falcons usually have fair skin and blonde hair. Being warm-blooded, they radiate heat like avians. Their eyes can be any shade of sapphire to blue-green, as well as silver and sometimes violet. Their hair usually develops blue, or violet streaks as they get more familiar with their magic. The customs concerning appearance on Ahnmik are strict, and the un-dyed strands are pinned back. It is also customary on Ahnmik for citizens to appear in Demi-form and not human form, like the serpiente and avians. Only quemak, kajaes, criminals, Pure Diamonds, and outsiders are forbidden to wear their wings openly. The vast majority of the falcon population wear their wings as a rule.

=== Obsidian Guild (Maeve'ra/White Vipers) ===
The Guild consists mainly of white vipers, the descendants of Maeve, and is first described in detail in Wolfcry. They live as exiles from serpiente society, surviving in the forests through hunting and trading with the local wolf pack. Occasionally exiled serpiente join them. Generally they are soldiers who refused to fight in the Avian-Serpiente War and were branded traitors. However, they also take in criminals who are willing to reform. Those who did not were forced out of the final safe haven. The members of the Guild follow the ways of the Nesera'rsh, the lower priests and priestesses of the Dasi cult. Because of this, the white vipers never lost their ability to do magic. However, since Maeve's magic revolved around the ability to keep the balance, their magic was never as destructive or powerful as that of the serpiente or falcons. The Rsh believed that everyone was connected on a basic level and thus when calling another by name you were really speaking your own name, hence members of the guild do not usually share their names except with their closest friends and family, being referred to only as Obsidian.

The rift between the guild and serpiente society dates back to the days of the Dasi, and they are wary of the Cobriana line. In the past there have been many occasions were amnesties were offered and mass executions were delivered. Though the Guild was pardoned two generations ago, and allowed back into serpiente society, only two members of the guild took up on the offer. Though there are no longer hostilities between the two groups, the guild prefers its wandering ways to the strict laws of Wyvern's Court.

=== Mistari ===
This tribe is briefly mentioned in Hawksong. They are tiger shapeshifters who originally lived in Asia but were forced out by humans. They are considered to be very wise and other tribes often come to them for advice in desperate situations. When Zane Cobriana chooses to finally arrange a meeting of the leaders of the serpiente and avians after his brother's death, the meeting was arranged to be held in Mistari lands. The Mistari's female leader, the Disa, was the one who suggested the union of the two peoples by the joining of the royal families. They are the oldest of all the shapeshifters. They are mentioned again in Persistence of Memory (a novel by Atwater-Rhodes outside the Kiesha'ra series).

=== Wolves ===
The wolves were first mentioned in Snakecharm, and explored indepth in Wolfcry. The wolf shapeshifters live in packs led by an alpha, who can be either male or female. Their society values honor, duty, hunting skills, and strength. Leadership of a pack is determined by brute strength, anyone can challenge an alpha for their position. Each pack lives individually, and there appears to be no unified leadership. The characteristics of each pack varies from pack to pack, though this is mostly determined by the climate in which each pack lives. The packs in the south appear friendly, while those in the north are much harsher. The wolves avoided interaction with both the Avians and the Serpiente, but opened trade with both once the war ended.

=== Lions ===
These shapeshifters were first introduced in Wolfcry. They have no kingdom or unified leadership, instead they are nomadic prides. They work primarily as mercenaries, traveling from marketplace to marketplace and to where ever their jobs take them.
