= List of vampires =

This is a list of vampires found in literary fiction; film and television; comics and manga; video games and board games; musical theatre, opera and theatre; and originating in folklore or mythology.

== Literary ==
=== A ===
- Aaron Darnell (Women of the Otherworld)
- Addhéma (Féval's La Vampire)
- Adrian Ivashkov (Vampire Academy)
- Akasha (The Vampire Chronicles)
- Alec (Twilight series)
- Alexander Sterling (Vampire Kisses)
- Akivasha (books and stories by Robert E. Howard)
- Alice Cullen (Twilight series)
- Alinska (Étienne-Léon de Lamothe-Langon's The Virgin Vampire)
- Alistair (Twilight series)
- Amelie (The Morganville Vampires)
- Amun (Twilight series)
- Andre Paul (The Southern Vampire Mysteries)
- Angel (Buffy the Vampire Slayer, Angel)
- Anita Blake (Anita Blake: Vampire Hunter)
- Anna von Schlotterstein (The Little Vampire)
- Anthea Ernchester (Those Who Hunt the Night, Traveling with the Dead)
- Anthony Francecszi (Necroscope: The Lost Years: Volume 1, Necroscope:The Lost Years: Volume 2)
- Aoife (The Necromancer: The Secrets of the Immortal Nicholas Flamel)
- Armand (The Vampire Chronicles)
- Aro (Twilight series)
- Arra Sails (The Saga of Darren Shan)
- Arrow (The Saga of Darren Shan)
- Ash Redfern (Night World)
- Asher (Anita Blake: Vampire Hunter)
- Athenodora (Twilight series)
- Ather (In the Forests of the Night)
- Aubrey (In the Forests of the Night)
- Aubrey (Anita Blake: Vampire Hunter)
- Augustine (Anita Blake: Vampire Hunter)
- Avicus (The Vampire Chronicles)
- Adrian "Alucard" Tepes (Castlevania)

=== B ===
- Balthazar More (Evernight)
- Barnabas Collins (Dark Shadows novels)
- Bella Cullen (Breaking Dawn) (Note: This character becomes a vampire later in the series.)
- Ben Cortman (I Am Legend)
- Benjamin (Twilight series)
- Benjamin "Jack" Force (Blue Bloods)
- Bianca Solderini (The Vampire Chronicles)
- Bianca St. Claire (The Dresden Files)
- Bill Compton (The Southern Vampire Mysteries)
- Bishop (The Morganville Vampires)
- Bones (Night Huntress series)
- Boris Dragosani (Necroscope series)
- Boris Liatoukine (Captain Vampire)
- Brad Moreau (Vampire Beach)
- Bree Tanner (Twilight series)
- Bunnicula (Bunnicula)

=== C ===
- Caelan (Skulduggery Pleasant)
- Caius (Twilight series)
- Camazotz (Vampire Plague)
- Camille Belcourt (The Mortal Instruments and The Infernal Devices)
- Carlisle Cullen (Twilight series)
- Carlos Rivera (The Vampire Huntress Legend)
- Carmen (Twilight series)
- Casanova (The Scarlet Cherie: Vampire Series)
- Carmilla Karnstein (Carmilla)
- Cassandra DuCharme (Women of the Otherworld)
- Caroline Forbes (The Vampire Diaries)
- Catherine "Cat" Crawfield (Night Huntress series)
- Charity More (Evernight)
- Charles (Twilight series)
- Charles Farren (Those Who Hunt the Night, Traveling with the Dead)
- Charles Twining (The Southern Vampire Mysteries)
- Charlotte (Twilight series)
- Chelsea (Twilight series)
- Chow (The Southern Vampire Mysteries)
- Chris (Thirsty)
- Christian (Lost Souls)
- Christian Ozera (Vampire Academy)
- Christopher Ravena (Shattered Mirror)
- Clarimonde (La Morte Amoureuse)
- Claudia (The Vampire Chronicles)
- Cordelia Van Alen (Blue Bloods)
- Count Dracula (Dracula, Young Dracula, Fred Saberhagen's The Dracula Series)
- Count Nightwing (Goosebumps)
- Countess Yvonne (Give Yourself Goosebumps)
- Count von Count (Sesame Street)

=== D ===
- D'Ablo (The Chronicles of Vladimir Tod)
- Daham Drakesh (Necroscope: The Lost Years: Volume 1, Necroscope:The Lost Years: Volume 2)
- Damian (Anita Blake: Vampire Hunter)
- Damien Maslin (House of Night series)
- Damon Salvatore (The Vampire Diaries)
- Daniel Molloy (The Vampire Chronicles)
- Danny Glick ('Salem's Lot)
- Darius Shan (The Saga of Darren Shan)
- Darren Shan (The Saga of Darren Shan)
- Darla (Angel)
- David Talbot (The Vampire Chronicles)
- Deathtopia Virtuoso Suicide-Master (Monogatari Series)
- Delanye Ellingham (Noctune Falls)
- Delos Redfern (Night World)
- Demetri (Twilight series)
- Devetaki Skullguise (Blood Brothers, The Last Aerie, Bloodwars)
- Didyme (Twilight series)
- Dimitri Belikov (Vampire Academy)
- Dio Brando (JoJo's Bizarre Adventure)
- Don Simon Christian Xavier Morado-de la Cadena Ysidro (Those Who Hunt the Night and Traveling with the Dead)
- Dorian (The Chronicles of Vladimir Tod)
- Dragon, King of Arms (Discworld)
- Dragon Lankford (House of Night series)
- Draculaura (Back And Deader Than Ever)
- Vlad Dracula Tepes (Castlevania)
- Dramaturgy (Monogatari Series)
- Drusilla (Buffy the Vampire Slayer, Angel)
- Dusk (Skulduggery Pleasant)
- The Dweller (Necroscope series)

=== E ===
- Ebony Dark'ness Dementia Raven Way (My Immortal (fan fiction))
- Edward Cullen (Twilight series)
- Edward Fender (The Last Vampire)
- Dr. Edward Lewis Weyland (The Vampire Tapestry)
- Eleazar (Twilight series)
- Elena Gilbert (The Vampire Diaries)
- Eli (Let The Right One In)
- Elijah Mikaelson (The Vampire Diaries)
- Elsie (Fangs)
- Emiel Regis Rohellec Terzieff-Godefroy (The Witcher series)
- Emmett Cullen (Twilight series)
- Enkil (The Vampire Chronicles)
- Episode (Monogatari Series)
- Erin Bates (House of Night series)
- Eric Northman (The Southern Vampire Mysteries)
- Erik Night (House of Night series)
- Esme Cullen (Twilight series)
- Eudoxia (The Vampire Chronicles)
- Eygor Killglance (Blood Brothers, The Last Aerie, Bloodwars)

=== F–I ===
- Faethor Ferenczy (Necroscope series)
- Fala (Demon in My View)
- Fallon Nuit (The Vampire Huntress Legend series)
- Felipe De Castro (The Southern Vampire Mysteries)
- Felix (Twilight series)
- Finn Mikaelson (The Vampire Diaries)
- Francesco Francesczi (Necroscope: The Lost Years: Volume 1, Necroscope:The Lost Years: Volume 2)
- Frank Collins (The Morganville Vampires)
- Gabrielle de Lioncourt (The Vampire Chronicles)
- Garrett (Twilight series)
- Garrid (The Frog Princess series)
- Gavner Purl (The Saga of Darren Shan)
- Godric (a.k.a. Godfrey) (The Southern Vampire Mysteries)
- Good Stab ("The Buffalo Hunter Hunter")
- Gorvi The Guile (Blood Brothers, The Last Aerie, Bloodwars)
- Gyaos (Gamera Franchise)
- Harmony (Buffy the Vampire Slayer, Angel)
- Harry Keogh (Necroscope series)
- Haru Nanakusa (Call of the Night)
- Heidi (Twilight series)
- High-Waist (Monogatari Series)
- Hope Mikaelson (The Vampire Diaries)
- Hrishi (Skulduggery Pleasant)
- Hugh Ellingham (Nocturn Falls)
- Hunter Redfern (Night World)
- Irina (Twilight series)
- Isabella von Carstein (Warhammer Fantasy Battles)
- Isara (Skulduggery Pleasant)
- Ivy Tamwood (Hollows series)

=== J ===
- Jack Twist (House of Night series)
- Jack Fleming (The Vampire Files)
- Jade Redfern (Night World)
- Jagger Maxwell (Vampire Kisses)
- James (Twilight series)
- James Harris (The Southern Book Club's Guide to Slaying Vampires)
- James Rasmussen (Night World)
- James Stark (House of Night series)
- Jander Sunstar (Vampire of the Mists)
- Janos Ferenczy (Necroscope series)
- Jane (Twilight series)
- Jasper Hale (Twilight series)
- Jean-Claude (Anita Blake: Vampire Hunter)
- Jenna Talbot (Hex Hall)
- Jesse Reeves (The Vampire Chronicles)
- Jeshickah (Midnight Predator)
- Jez Stukeley (Vampirates)
- Jezebel 'Jez' Redfern (Night World)
- Joel Desmodus (Desmodus)
- John "Not-A-Vampire-At-All" Smith (Discworld)
- Jonathan Barrett (The Vampire Files)
- John Mitchell (Being Human)
- John Quinn (Night World)
- Johnny Desperado (Vampirates)
- John Quinn 'Quinn' (Night World)
- Jukka Sarasti (Blindsight)

=== K ===
- Kabura Honda (Call of the Night)
- Kachiri (Twilight series)
- Kain (Legacy of Kain series)
- Kaleo (Shattered Mirror)
- Kalika (The Last Vampire)
- Lady Karen (Necroscope series)
- Kaspar Varn (The Dark Heroine)
- Kate (Twilight series)
- Katherine Pierce (The Vampire Diaries)
- Kebi (Twilight series)
- Kestrel Redfern (Night World)
- Kira (Night Huntress series)
- Kiss-Shot Acerola-Orion Heart-Under-Blade (Monogatari Series)
- Khayman (The Vampire Chronicles)
- Klaus Mikaelson (The Vampire Diaries)
- Kojou Akatsuki (Strike the Blood)
- Kol Mikaelson (The Vampire Diaries)
- Kostaki Brankovan (Alexandre Dumas & Paul Bocage's The Pale Lady/The Vampire Of The Carpathians)
- Koyomi Araragi (Monogatari Series)
- Kurda Smahlt (The Saga of Darren Shan)
- Kurt Barlow ('Salem's Lot)
- Konrad von Carstein (Warhammer Fantasy)

=== L ===
- Lady Margolotta (Discworld)
- Lara Raith (The Dresden Files)
- Larten Crepsley (The Saga of Darren Shan)
- Laurent (Twilight series)
- Lawrence Van Alen (Blue Bloods)
- Lestat de Lioncourt (The Vampire Chronicles)
- Liam (Twilight series)
- Leif Helgarson (The Iron Druid Chronicles)
- Lenobia (House of Night series)
- Lilith (The Vampire Huntress Legend series)
- Lily Chen (The Mortal Instruments series)
- Louis de Pointe du Lac (The Vampire Chronicles)
- Long Shadow (The Southern Vampire Mysteries)
- Lorcan Furey (Vampirates)
- Lord Ruthven ("The Vampyre")
- Loren Blake (House of Night series)
- Lorenzo St. John (The Vampire Diaries)
- Lucy (Twilight series)
- Lucy Westenra (Dracula)
- Lothos (Buffy the Vampire Slayer)
- LoveGreen (Call of the Night)
- Low-Rise (Monogatari Series)
- Luna Maxwell (Vampire Kisses)
- Lucas Ross (Evernight)

=== M ===
- Madeline "Mimi" Force (Blue Bloods)
- Mael (The Vampire Chronicles)
- Maggie (Twilight series)
- Maglore The Mage (Blood Brothers, The Last Aerie, Bloodwars)
- Magnus (The Vampire Chronicles)
- Magnus de la Gardie (Count Magnus)
- Magpyr family (Discworld)
- Maharet (The Vampire Chronicles)
- Makenna (Twilight series)
- Maladict (Discworld)
- Mannfred von Carstein (Warhammer Fantasy Battles)
- Marcus (Twilight series)
- Maria (Twilight series)
- Mary (Twilight series)
- The Master (Buffy the Vampire Slayer, Angel)
- The Master (The Destroyer)
- Matthew de Clairmont (A Discovery of Witches)
- Maureen Brown (The Mortal Instruments)
- Mavra (The Dresden Files)
- Maya Redfern (Night World)
- Mekare (The Vampire Chronicles)
- Mencheres (Night Huntress series)
- Michael Glass (The Morganville Vampires)
- Midori Kohakobe (Call of the Night)
- Mikaela Hyakuya (Seraph of the End)
- Mika Ver Leth (The Saga of Darren Shan)
- Mircea Basarab (The Cassandra Palmer series)
- Moka Akashiya (Rosario + Vampire novelization)
- Moloch (Skulduggery Pleasant)
- Molochai (Lost Souls)
- Morning McCobb (Suck It Up)
- Morgead Blackthorn (Night World)
- Myrnin (The Morganville Vampires)

=== N ===
- Natasha "Tasha" Ozera (Vampire Academy)
- Nathaniel Cade (Blood Oath)
- Nazuna Nanakusa (Call of the Night)
- Neferata (Warhammer Fantasy Battles)
- Neferet (House of Night series)
- Nestor Lichloathe (Blood Brothers, The Last Aerie, Bloodwars)
- Nettie (Twilight series)
- Nicholas "Nick" Knight (Forever Knight)
- Nicolas de Lenfent (The Vampire Chronicles)
- Niko Hirata (Call of the Night)
- Nikolas Ravena (Shattered Mirror)
- Nissa Ravena (Shattered Mirror)
- Noah Vance (I Heart Vampires: Birth (A Confessions of a High School Vampire Novel))
- Nothing (Lost Souls)
- Nukesaku (JoJo's Bizarre Adventure: Stardust Crusaders)
- Nicodemus "Nicky" Petty (Carry On)

=== O ===
- Oliver (The Morganville Vampires)
- Otis (The Chronicles of Vladimir Tod)
- Otto von Chriek (Discworld)

=== P ===
- Pam Ravenscroft (The Southern Vampire Mysteries)
- Pandora (The Vampire Chronicles)
- Paris Skyle (The Saga of Darren Shan)
- Peter (Twilight series)
- Petronia (The Vampire Chronicles)
- Piscary (Hollows series)
- Poppy North (Night World)

=== Q ===
- Quinn Talen (My Vampire System)

=== R ===
- Raphael Santiago (The Mortal Instruments series)
- Radu Lykan (Necroscope: The Lost Years: Volume 1, Necroscope:The Lost Years: Volume 2)
- Raven Madison (Vampire Kisses)
- Randall (Twilight series)
- Rebekah Mikaelson (The Vampire Diaries)
- Renata (Twilight series)
- Riley Biers (Twilight series)
- Richard D'orleans/Richard Dun (Lord Richard, Vampire)
- Risika (In the Forests of the Night)
- Rosalie Hale (Twilight series)
- Roman Reeder
- Rowan Redfern (Night World)
- Rudolph Sackville-Bagg (Rüdiger von Schlotterstein) (The Little Vampire)
- Rynn Cormel (Hollows series)
- Ramil{Revamp The Undead}
- Reti

=== S ===
- Sabra (Lord Richard, Vampire)
- Sacred Ancestor (Vampire Hunter D)
- Saint-Germain (The Saint-Germain novels)
- Salacia "Sally" von Humpeding (Discworld)
- Samuel (Skulduggery Pleasant)
- Sanguini (Harry Potter and the Half-Blood Prince)
- Santiago (The Vampire Chronicles)
- Santiago (Twilight series)
- Santino (The Vampire Chronicles)
- Sara Vida (Shattered Mirror)
- Sasha (Twilight series)
- Sauron (The Silmarillion)
- Seishiro Shishirui (Monogatari Series)
- Selene (Underworld novelizations)
- Seri Kikiyou (Call of the Night)
- Sethra Lavode (Phoenix Guards books and Vlad Taltos series)
- Seymour Dorsten (The Last Vampire)
- Shaitan (Necroscope series)
- Shaithis (Necroscope series)
- Shaunee Cole (House of Night series)
- Shinobu Oshino (Monogatari Series)
- Shizuka Hio (Vampire Knight)
- Sienna Devereux (Vampire Beach series)
- Silas (The Graveyard Book)
- Simon (The Silver Kiss)
- Simon Lewis (The Mortal Instruments)
- Sinclair Jace/Mino/Estelle/Lucas (Constellation)
- Siobhan (Twilight series)
- Sir Francis Varney (Varney the Vampire)
- Sita (The Last Vampire)
- Slayer (Guilty Gear)
- Snow Witch (Fighting Fantasy series)
- Sonja (Underworld: Rise of the Lycans novelization)
- Sonja Blue (Sunglasses After Dark and other novels by Nancy A. Collins)
- Sonya Karp (Vampire Academy)
- Sophia Keren (So I'm a Spider, So What?)
- Sophie-Anne Leclerq (The Southern Vampire Mysteries)
- Sorin Markov (Zendikar: In the Teeth of Akoum)
- Spike (Buffy the Vampire Slayer, Angel)
- Spade (Night Huntress series)
- Stefan (Twilight series)
- Stefan Salvatore (The Vampire Diaries)
- Stevie Rae Johnson (House of Night series)
- Mrs. Stone (The Room in the Tower)
- Strahd von Zarovich (Ravenloft novels)
- Straits/Straizo (JoJo's Bizarre Adventure: Battle Tendency)
- Sulpicia (Twilight series)

=== T ===
- Tanya (Twilight series)
- Tatiana Ivashkov (Vampire Academy)
- Tarquin "Quinn" Blackwood (The Vampire Chronicles)
- Thierry Descoudres (Night World)
- Thibor Ferenczy (Necroscope series)
- Thomas Raith (The Dresden Files)
- Timmy Jordan (Night World)
- Timmy Valentine (Vampire Junction)
- Tomas Tod (The Chronicles of Vladimir Tod)
- Tropicalesque Home-A-Wave Dog-Strings (Monogatari Series)
- Thuringwethil (The Silmarillion)
- Twig (Lost Souls)
- Tyrannus Basilton "Baz" Grimm-Pitch (Carry On)

=== V ===
- Valentine Cutter (Shadow Zone: The Undead Express)
- Valerie (The Vampire Diaries)
- Veronik Crnjak (The Vampire Diaries)
- Valentine (Monster High)
- Vamp (Fangs)
- Vanilla Ice (JoJo's Bizarre Adventure: Stardust Crusaders)
- Vasagi the Suck (Blood Brothers, The Last Aerie, Bloodwars)
- Vasilisa "Lissa" Dragomir (Vampire Academy)
- Vasilii (Twilight series)
- Vancha March (The Saga of Darren Shan)
- Vanez Blane (The Saga of Darren Shan)
- Victor (Skulduggery Pleasant)
- Victoria (Twilight series)
- Victoria "Vicki" Donovan (The Vampire Diaries)
- Vikas (The Chronicles of Vladimir Tod)
- Violet Lee (The Dark Heroine)
- Vlad Tepesh (Night Huntress series)
- Vladimir (Twilight series)
- Vlad von Carstein (Warhammer Fantasy Battles)
- Vormulac Unsleep (Blood Brothers, The Last Aerie, Bloodwars)

=== W ===
- Wired Beck (JoJo's Bizarre Adventure: Battle Tendency)
- Whitey Kroun (The Vampire Files)
- Wran Killglance (Blood Brothers, The Last Aerie, Bloodwars)
- Wratha The Risen (Blood Brothers, The Last Aerie, Bloodwars)

=== Y ===
- Yaksha (The Last Vampire)
- Ysandre (The Morganville Vampires)
- Yulian Bodescu (Necroscope series)

=== Z ===
- Zafrina (Twilight series)
- Zenobia (The Vampire Chronicles)
- Zero Kiryuu (Vampire Knight)
- Zillah (Lost Souls)
- Zoe Takano (Women of the Otherworld)
- Zoey Redbird (House of Night series)

== Film and television ==
| Role | Title | Notes | Refs |
|---|---|---|---|
| Abby | Let Me In | | |
| Abby Bennett Wilson | The Vampire Diaries | | |
| Abel Nightroad | Trinity Blood | | |
| Abhay Raichand | Pyaar Kii Ye Ek Kahaani | | |
| Absalom | Buffy the Vampire Slayer | | |
| Adam Jacobs | Being Human, Becoming Human | | |
| Adam | Only Lovers Left Alive | | |
| Adam | Abraham Lincoln: Vampire Hunter | | |
| Augusto Pinochet | El Conde | | |
| Aidan Waite | Being Human | | |
| Alaric Saltzman | The Vampire Diaries | | |
| Aleera | Van Helsing | | |
| Alex Lowe | American Horror Story: Hotel | | |
| Alexander Lucard | Dracula: The Series | | |
| Alexandra Serris | Kindred: The Embraced | | |
| Alfred | The Fearless Vampire Killers | | |
| Alice Cullen | The Twilight Saga | | |
| Alison Bromley | Daybreakers | | |
| Alonna Gunn | Angel | | |
| Alpha Vampire, The | Supernatural | | |
| Alphonse | Buffy the Vampire Slayer | | |
| Alucard | Hellsing | | |
| Alucard | Son of Dracula | | |
| Alucard van Heusen | Wizards of Waverly Place | | |
| Amelia | Underworld | David's mother and one of the original vampire Elders | |
| Andrew Borba | Buffy the Vampire Slayer | | |
| Andrew Hoelich | Buffy the Vampire Slayer | | |
| Angel | Buffy the Vampire Slayer, Angel | | |
| Anna | The Vampire Diaries | | |
| Anna von Schlotterstein | The Little Vampire | | |
| Anne Pratt | Buffy the Vampire Slayer | | |
| The Anointed One | Buffy the Vampire Slayer | | |
| Archon Raine | Kindred: The Embraced | | |
| Armand | Interview with the Vampire, Queen of the Damned | | |
| Armand Tesla | The Return of the Vampire | | |
| Artemis ("Arte") | Tsukuyomi: Moon Phase | | |
| Asad | Blade II | | |
| Ashley von Ghoulfangs | School for Vampires | | |
| Ashley Magnus | Sanctuary | | |
| Atilla Westenra | Young Dracula | | |
| Aukon | Doctor Who | | |
| Ava | Only Lovers Left Alive | | |
| Barnabas Collins | Dark Shadows | | |
| Bella Cullen | The Twilight Saga: Breaking Dawn | | |
| Ben McKittrick | The Vampire Diaries | | |
| Benny Lafitte | Supernatural | | |
| Bertrand De Fortunessa | Young Dracula | | |
| Bianca | The Dresden Files | | |
| Bill Compton | True Blood | | |
| Billy "Ford" Fordham | Buffy the Vampire Slayer | | |
| Black Hat | Priest | | |
| Blair | Buffy the Vampire Slayer | | |
| Blood King | Brave Animated Series | | |
| Boone | Buffy the Vampire Slayer | | |
| Boris Dracula | Young Dracula | | |
| Bree Tanner | The Twilight Saga | | |
| Buffy Summers | Buffy the Vampire Slayer | Episode "Nightmares (Buffy the Vampire Slayer)" | |
| Butcherbird 'Butch' Vlad | Blood Ties | | |
| Caleb Colton | Near Dark | | |
| Caleb Morley | Port Charles | | |
| Cameron | Kindred: The Embraced | | |
| Camilla | Doctor Who | | |
| Candy Gorch | Buffy the Vampire Slayer | | |
| Carl | Being Human | | |
| Carmel | Split | | |
| Carmilla Karnstein | Carmilla, The Carmilla Movie | | |
| Carlisle Cullen | The Twilight Saga | | |
| Caroline Forbes | The Vampire Diaries | | |
| Cash | Kindred: The Embraced | | |
| Celia | Blood Ties | | |
| Charles Bromley | Daybreakers | | |
| Charlotte | Buffy the Vampire Slayer | | |
| Chase | Blade: The Series | | |
| Christian Ozera | Vampire Academy | | |
| Christopher Caruso | Daybreakers | | |
| Christopher Marlowe | Only Lovers Left Alive | | |
| Chupa | Blade II | | |
| Chow Lin | True Blood | | |
| Cindy van Heusen | Wizards of Waverly Place | | |
| Claire Radcliff | The Gates | | |
| Claudia | Interview with the Vampire | | |
| Coach Feratu | Rick and Morty | Episode "Big Trouble In Little Sanchez" | |
| Cody Puckett | Blood Ties | | |
| Colin | Dante's Cove, The Lair | | |
| Colin Robinson | What We Do in the Shadows (TV series) | Energy vampire | |
| Coraline | Moonlight | | |
| Count Dracula | Various films and television episodes | | |
| Count Fangula | Big Bad Beetleborgs | | |
| Count Orlok | Nosferatu | | |
| Count von Count | Sesame Street | | |
| The Countess | Once Bitten | | |
| Count von Krolock | The Fearless Vampire Killers | | |
| D | Vampire Hunter D | | |
| Daedalus | Kindred: The Embraced | | |
| Daisy Hannigan-Spiteri | Being Human | | |
| Dalton | Buffy the Vampire Slayer | | |
| Damian Courtenay | The Lair | | |
| Damon Salvatore | The Vampire Diaries | | |
| Danica Talos | Blade: Trinity | | |
| Darla | Buffy the Vampire Slayer, Angel | | |
| Darren Shan | Cirque du Freak: The Vampire's Assistant | | |
| David | The Lost Boys | | |
| Deacon | What We Do In The Shadows | | |
| Deacon Frost | Blade | | |
| Desmond Tiny | Cirque du Freak: The Vampire's Assistant | | |
| Dewi Jenkins | Being Human | | |
| Diamondback | Near Dark | | |
| Dimitri Denatos | Mom's Got a Date With a Vampire | | |
| Diva | Blood + | | |
| Donovan | American Horror Story: Hotel | | |
| Doug Sanders | Angel | | |
| Dracula | The Batman vs Dracula | | |
| Draculaura | Monster High | | |
| Drew French | Vampire High | | |
| Drusilla | Buffy the Vampire Slayer, Angel | | |
| Duckula | Duckula | | |
| Duke | Bit | | |
| Dwayne | The Lost Boys | | |
| Dylan Radcliff | The Gates | | |
| Eddie Fiori | Kindred: The Embraced | | |
| Edward Cullen | The Twilight Saga | | |
| Edward Dalton | Daybreakers | | |
| Edward Lee | Fright Night | | |
| Edward Sullen | Vampires Suck | | |
| Edward Thompson | Fright Night | | |
| Elena Gilbert | The Vampire Diaries | | |
| Elfriede | Tsukuyomi: Moon Phase | | |
| Eli | Let the Right One In | | |
| Eli Chelarin | Blood Ties | | |
| Eli Damaskinos | Blade II | | |
| Elijah Mikaelson | The Vampire Diaries, The Originals | | |
| Elisabeth | Angel | | |
| Elissabat | Monster High | | |
| Elizabeth Johnson | American Horror Story: Hotel | | |
| Emmett Cullen | The Twilight Saga | | |
| Emily | Let's Scare Jessica to Death | | |
| The Empress Eyes | Adventure Time | | |
| Eramus | The Monster Club | | |
| Eric Gracen | Valemont | | |
| Eric Northman | True Blood | | |
| Erica | My Babysitter's a Vampire | | |
| Erin Noble | Young Dracula | | |
| Ernest | Ernest le Vampire | | |
| Esme Cullen | The Twilight Saga | | |
| Essie Rachimova | Vampire High | | |
| Ethan Morgan | My Babysitter's a Vampire | | |
| Eve | Only Lovers Left Alive | | |
| Finn Mikaelson | The Vampire Diaries | | |
| The Fool | Adventure Time | | |
| Florence Finnegan/Plasmavore | Doctor Who | Episode "Smith and Jones" | |
| Frankie Dalton | Daybreakers | | |
| Franklin Mott | True Blood | | |
| Franz Edlemann | House of Dracula | | |
| Frog | Bit | | |
| Gavner Purl | Cirque du Freak: The Vampire's Assistant | | |
| Glenn | Buffy the Vampire Slayer | | |
| Godric | True Blood | | |
| Gorca | Black Sabbath | | |
| Gordon Walker | Supernatural | | |
| Grandpa Munster | The Munsters | | |
| The Great Vampire | Doctor Who | | |
| Guy Rosen | Split | | |
| Gyaos | Gamera franchise | Gamera's archnemeise | |
| Hal Yorke | Being Human | | |
| Harmony Kendall | Buffy the Vampire Slayer, Angel | | |
| Harper | The Vampire Diaries | | |
| Harry Martin / Harlevon Martinescu | Blood Ties | | |
| Hayley Marshall | The Originals, The Vampire Diaries | | |
| Hazuki/Luna | Tsukuyomi: Moon Phase | | |
| Henry Fitzroy | Blood Ties | | |
| Henry Sturges | Abraham Lincoln: Vampire Hunter | | |
| Herbert von Krolock | The Fearless Vampire Killers | | |
| Hetty | Being Human | | |
| The Hierophant | Adventure Time | | |
| Holden Lowe | American Horror Story: Hotel | | |
| Holden Webster | Buffy the Vampire Slayer | | |
| Homer | Near Dark | | |
| Ian | The Haunted House | | |
| Ion Fortuna | Trinity Blood | | |
| Incognito | Hellsing | | |
| Ingrid Dracula | Young Dracula | | |
| Irina von Karlstein | Female Vampire | | |
| Iris | American Horror Story: Hotel | | |
| Ivan | Being Human | | |
| Ivan Dracula | Young Dracula | | |
| Izzy | Bit | | |
| Jack | Ultraviolet | | |
| James | Angel | | |
| James | The Twilight Saga | | |
| James Bishop | Being Human | | |
| James Kent | True Blood | | |
| Jan Valentine | Hellsing | | |
| Janette DuCharme | Forever Knight | | |
| Janos Skorzeny | The Night Stalker | | |
| Jared Nomak | Blade II | | |
| Jasper Hale | Twilight | | |
| Javier Vachon | Forever Knight | | |
| Jay-Don | Angel | | |
| Jebedia Loven | Stake Land | | |
| Jenna Sommers | The Vampire Diaries | | |
| Jesse McNally | Buffy the Vampire Slayer | | |
| Jeremy Capello | My Best Friend Is a Vampire | | |
| Jerry | Buffy the Vampire Slayer | | |
| Jerry Dandridge | Fright Night | | |
| Jesse Hooker | Near Dark | | |
| Jessica Hamby | True Blood | | |
| Jiro Mochizuki | Black Blood Brothers | | |
| Joker | The Batman vs Dracula | | |
| John Mitchell | Being Human | | |
| Josef Konstan | Moonlight | | |
| Judas Iscariot | The Librarian: Curse of the Judas Chalice | | |
| Julia | Buffy the Vampire Slayer | | |
| Julian Luna | Kindred: The Embraced | | |
| Juliet Van Heusen | Wizards of Waverly Place | | |
| Justin | Buffy the Vampire Slayer | | |
| Kakistos | Buffy the Vampire Slayer | | |
| Katherine Pierce | The Vampire Diaries | | |
| Karin Maaka | Chibi Vampire | | |
| Karl Todman | Vampire High | | |
| Katherine 'Kay' Caldwell | Son of Dracula | | |
| Keith | True Blood | | |
| Kojou Akatsuki | Strike the Blood | Formerly human, he became the 4th Primogenitor before the events in Volume 1. | |
| Kokoa Shuzen | Rosario+Vampire Capu2 | | |
| Kol Mikaelson | The Vampire Diaries, The Originals | | |
| Kostya Saushkin | Night Watch | | |
| Kraven | Underworld series | | |
| Krista Starr | Blade: The Series | | |
| Kroan Westenra | Young Dracula | | |
| L | Vampire Prosecutor | | |
| Laddie | The Lost Boys | | |
| Larten Crepsley | Cirque du Freak: The Vampire's Assistant | | |
| Lauren Drake | Being Human | | |
| Laszlo Cravensworth | What We Do in the Shadows (TV series) | | |
| Laurel | Bit | | |
| Laurent | The Twilight Saga | | |
| Lenny | Buffy the Vampire Slayer | | |
| Lee Kai | Split | | |
| Leopold 'Leo' Zachs | Split | | |
| Lestat de Lioncourt | Interview with the Vampire, Queen of the Damned | | |
| Lexi Branson | The Vampire Diaries | | |
| Lighthammer | Blade II | | |
| Lillie Langtry | Kindred: The Embraced | | |
| Lily Munster | The Munsters | | |
| Lionel "Elvis" Cormac | Daybreakers | | |
| Logan Fell | The Vampire Diaries | | |
| Lorena Krasiki | True Blood | | |
| Lucien LaCroix | Forever Knight | | |
| Lucifer | Dragon Ball: Sleeping Princess in Devil's Castle | | |
| Luke | Buffy the Vampire Slayer | | |
| Luke Valentine | Hellsing | | |
| Louis de Pointe du Lac | Interview with the Vampire, Queen of the Damned | | |
| Lumpi von Schlotterstein | The Little Vampire | | |
| Lyle Gorch | Buffy the Vampire Slayer | | |
| Ma Gorch | Buffy the Vampire Slayer | | |
| Madeleine Éparvier | Interview With The Vampire s2'' | | |
| Mae | Near Dark | | |
| Magda | The Fearless Vampire Killers | | |
| Magda Westenra | Young Dracula | | |
| Maggie Gracen | Valemont | | |
| The Magister | True Blood | | |
| Magnus Imperial | Imortal | | |
| Magnus Lee | Vampire Hunter D | | |
| Maithili | Pyaar Kii Ye Ek Kahaani | | |
| Malcolm | True Blood | | |
| Mamuwalde | Blacula, Scream Blacula Scream | | |
| Marcel Gerard | The Originals | | |
| Marceline the Vampire Queen | Adventure Time | | |
| Marshall Lee the Vampire King | Adventure Time | | |
| Marcus | Angel | | |
| Marcus Corvinus | Underworld series | | |
| Marcus Van Sciver | Blade: The Series | | |
| Marie | Innocent Blood | | |
| Marishka | Van Helsing | | |
| Marko | The Lost Boys | | |
| Martine Bancroft | Morbius | | |
| Marty Strickland | Vampire High | | |
| Mary | The Vampire Diaries | | |
| Marya Zaleska | Dracula's Daughter | | |
| The Master | Buffy the Vampire Slayer, Angel | | |
| Mateo Rodriguez | Imortal | | |
| Mavis | Hotel Transylvania | | |
| Max | The Lost Boys | | |
| Max Ellison | American Horror Story: Hotel | | |
| Max Phillips | Bloodsucking Bastards | | |
| Maximillian | Vampire In Brooklyn | | |
| Meier Link | Vampire Hunter D | | |
| Merrill Young | Vampire High | | |
| Michael Emerson | The Lost Boys | | |
| Michael Morbius | Morbius | | |
| Mick St. John | Moonlight | | |
| Mikael | The Vampire Diaries | | |
| Milo | Morbius | | |
| Min Tae-yeon | Vampire Prosecutor | | |
| Mina Tepes | Dance in the Vampire Bund | | |
| Mina Harker | Various films and television shows | | |
| Modoc | My Best Friend Is a Vampire | | |
| Moka Akashiya | Rosario + Vampire | | |
| The Moon | Adventure Time | | |
| Murlough | Cirque du Freak: The Vampire's Assistant | | |
| Myotismon | Digimon Adventure | | |
| Natacha Rambova | American Horror Story: Hotel | | |
| Nadia Petrova | The Vampire Diaries | | |
| Nadja of Antipaxos | What We Do in the Shadows (TV series) | | |
| Nandor the Relentless | What We Do in the Shadows (TV series) | | |
| Natasha Neckinski | Gravedale High | | |
| Nicholas "Nick" Knight | Forever Knight | | |
| Nick Cutler | Being Human | | |
| Nick | What We Do In The Shadows | | |
| Nick McCabre | I Heart Vampires | | |
| Niklaus 'Klaus' Mikaelson | The Vampire Diaries, The Originals | | |
| Nikola Tesla | Sanctuary (TV series) | | |
| Nikolai | The Phantom Hour | | |
| Nora | My Best Friend Is a Vampire | | |
| Nora Gainesborough | True Blood | | |
| NOS-4-A2 | Buzz Lightyear of Star Command | | |
| Nostroyev | Angel | | |
| Nyssa Damaskinos | Blade II | | |
| Olga Dracula | Young Dracula | | |
| Olivia Godfrey | Hemlock Grove | | |
| Oskar von Horrificus | School for Vampires | | |
| Pamela Swynford De Beaufort | True Blood | | |
| Petyr | What We Do In The Shadows | | |
| Phoebe LaVie | Rockula | | |
| Priest | Blade II | | |
| Prince of Lies | Angel | | |
| Ponti | Ponti Anak Remaja | | |
| Quacula | The New Adventures of Mighty Mouse and Heckle & Jeckle | | |
| Quincey | Demons | | |
| Quinlan | The Strain (TV series) | | |
| Racquel | Blade (film) | | |
| Ramona Royale | American Horror Story: Hotel | | |
| Ralph LaVie | Rockula | | |
| Radu Vladislas | Subspecies | | |
| Raphael Santiago | Shadowhunters | | |
| Rebecca Barnes | Deadly Love | | |
| Rebekah Mikaelson | The Vampire Diaries, The Originals | | |
| Regus | Being Human | | |
| Reinhardt | Blade II | | |
| Remmick | Sinners (2025 film) | | |
| Renesmee Cullen | The Twilight Saga: Breaking Dawn | | |
| Riley Biers | The Twilight Saga | | |
| Rip van Winkle | Hellsing | | |
| Roman Rodriguez | Imortal | | |
| Roman Zimojic | True Blood | | |
| Ronnie Strickland | The X-Files | | |
| Rookie | Buffy the Vampire Slayer | | |
| Rory Keaner | My Babysitter's a Vampire | | |
| Rosalie Hale | The Twilight Saga | | |
| Roya | Bit | | |
| Rüdiger von Schlotterstein | The Little Vampire | | |
| Rudolph Valentino | American Horror Story: Hotel | | |
| Rush | Blade II | | |
| Russell Edgington | True Blood | | |
| Russell Winters | Angel | | |
| Ryan Noble | Young Dracula | | |
| Salvatore "Sal the Shark" Macelli | Innocent Blood | | |
| Sam Lawson | Angel | | |
| Samantha Imperial | Imortal | | |
| Mr. Sanderson | Buffy the Vampire Slayer | | |
| Sandy | Buffy the Vampire Slayer | | |
| Santanico Pandemonium | From Dusk Till Dawn: The Series | | |
| Sarah | My Babysitter's a Vampire | | |
| Sarah Shagal | The Fearless Vampire Killers | | |
| Sarah Holtz | Angel | | |
| Sasha Luna | Kindred: The Embraced | | |
| Saya | Blood: The Last Vampire/Blood + | | |
| Selene | Underworld series | | |
| Seras Victoria | Hellsing | | |
| Sergei Kubichek | The Librarian: Curse of the Judas Chalice | | |
| Seth | Being Human | | |
| Severen | Near Dark | | |
| Sibella Dracula | Scooby-Doo and the Ghoul School | | |
| Siddharth Raichand | Pyaar Kii Ye Ek Kahaani | | |
| Silas | The Vampire Diaries | | |
| Simon Lewis | Shadowhunters | | |
| Simone Renor | The Librarian: Curse of the Judas Chalice | | |
| Snowman | Blade II | | |
| Sophie-Anne Leclerq | True Blood | | |
| Spike | Buffy the Vampire Slayer, Angel | | |
| Star | The Lost Boys | | |
| Stefan Salvatore | The Vampire Diaries | | |
| Steve Leonard | Cirque du Freak: The Vampire's Assistant | | |
| Steve Newlin | True Blood | | |
| Steven Cooper / "The Master" | Bullets, Fangs and Dinner at 8 | | |
| Straits/Straizo | JoJo's Bizarre Adventure: Battle Tendency | | |
| Sunday | Buffy the Vampire Slayer | | |
| Suren | Being Human | | |
| Talbot | True Blood | | |
| Tara Thornton | True Blood | | |
| Tatsuhiko Shido | Nightwalker: The Midnight Detective | | |
| Tector Gorch | Buffy the Vampire Slayer | | |
| Thatch | Casper's Scare School (movie), Casper's Scare School (TV series) | | |
| Theresa Klusmeyer | Buffy the Vampire Slayer | | |
| Thierry Vanchure | The Originals | | |
| Tom | Buffy the Vampire Slayer | | |
| Tristan Duffy | American Horror Story: Hotel | | |
| Mr. Trick | Buffy the Vampire Slayer | | |
| Tyler Lockwood | The Vampire Diaries | | |
| Vasilisa 'Lissa' Dragomir | Vampire Academy | | |
| Vampire King | Adventure Time | | |
| Vanilla Ice | JoJo's Bizarre Adventure: Stardust Crusaders | | |
| Verona | Van Helsing | | |
| Viago | What We Do In The Shadows | | |
| Victoria | The Twilight Saga | | |
| Vicki Donovan | The Vampire Diaries | | |
| Viktor | Underworld (film series) | | |
| Vinnie Stoker | Gravedale High | | |
| Vlad | Mina and the Count | | |
| Vlad | Bit | | |
| Vlad Dracula | The Librarian: Curse of the Judas Chalice | | |
| Vladimir Dracula | Young Dracula | | |
| Vladislav | What We Do In The Shadows | | |
| Walter C. Dornez | Hellsing | | |
| Will Clarke | Young Dracula | | |
| William Herrick | Being Human | | |
| Willow Rosenberg | Buffy the Vampire Slayer | Episodes "Doppelgangland" and "The Wish" | |
| Willa Burrell | True Blood | | |
| Wren | American Horror Story: Hotel | | |
| Xander Harris | Buffy the Vampire Slayer | Episode "The Wish" | |
| Yoine Shagal | The Fearless Vampire Killers | | |
| Yorga | Count Yorga, Vampire | | |
| Zachary Kralik | Buffy the Vampire Slayer | | |
| Zane | Kindred: The Embraced | | |
| Zargo | Doctor Who | | |
| Zorin Blitz | Hellsing | | |

== Comics and manga ==
- Akasha Bloodriver (Rosario+Vampire)
- Akatsuki Kain (Vampire Knight)
- Alexander Sterling (Vampire Kisses)
- Alucard (Hellsing)
- Andrew Bennett (I...Vampire)
- Angel (Buffy comics/Buffyverse comics/Angel comics)
- Ayato Sakamaki (Diabolik Lovers')
- Aqua Shuzen (Rosario+Vampire)
- Basteya Irclu (Seraph of the End)
- Bridget Brownlick (Chibi Vampire)
- Blade (Marvel Comics)
- Bloodcoven (Marvel Comics)
- Bloodstorm (Marvel Comics)
- Bloodstorm One (Marvel Comics)
- Boris Tepes Dracula (Shaman King)
- Braz D. Blood (Blood Lad)
- Chastity Marks (Chastity)
- Crowley Eusford (Seraph of the End)
- Dagon / Nightrider (Team Titans)
- Darla (Buffy comics/Buffyverse comics/Angel comics)
- Dracula / Fangs the Vampire (Dragon Ball)
- Drusilla (Buffy comics/Buffyverse comics/Angel comics)
- Deacon Frost (The Tomb of Dracula)
- Dio Brando (JoJo's Bizarre Adventure)
- Diva (Blood+)
- Dominique "Domi" de Sade (The Case Study of Vanitas)
- Dolorosa (The Dolorosa) (Homestuck)
- Elfriede (Tsukuyomi: Moon Phase)
- Evangeline A.K. McDowell (Negima and UQ Holder! series)
- Fai D. Flowright (Tsubasa: Reservoir Chronicle)
- Ferid Bathory (Seraph of the End)
- Glark (Chibi Vampire)
- Guilt-na-Zan (Vampire Doll: Guilt-Na-Zan)
- Haji (Blood+)
- Hanabusa Aido (Vampire Knight)
- Hannibal King (Marvel Comics)
- Harmony (Buffy comics/Buffyverse comics/Angel comics)
- Haruka Kuran (Vampire Knight)
- Hazuki/Luna (Tsukuyomi: Moon Phase)
- Hellcow (Marvel Comics)
- Henry Marker (Chibi Vampire)
- Hunger (Marvel Comics)
- Issa Shuzen (Rosario+Vampire)
- Jeanne ("The Case Study of Vanitas")
- Jeremiah Parrish (Astro City)
- Jiro Mochizuki (Black Blood Brothers)
- Joa (Transfusions Web Comic)
- Joaquin Torres (Marvel Comics)
- Jubilee (Marvel Comics)
- Jules Duchon (Fat White Vampire Blues)
- Kahlua Shuzen (Rosario+Vampire)
- Kamui Shirō (Tsubasa: Reservoir Chronicle)
- Kaname Kuran (Vampire Knight)
- Kanaya Maryam (Homestuck)
- Karin Maaka (Chibi Vampire light novels)
- Kars (JoJo's Bizarre Adventure)
- Koko Shuzen (Rosario+Vampire)
- Kojou Akatsuki (Strike the Blood)
- Krul Tepes (Seraph of the End)
- Jan Valentine (Hellsing)
- Lilith (Marvel Comics)
- Liz T. Blood (Blood Lad)
- Looker (DC Comics)
- Luke Valentine (Hellsing)
- Maaka family (Chibi Vampire)
- Marlowe (30 Days of Night)
- Mary Seward (I…Vampire)
- The Master (Buffy comics/Buffyverse comics/Angel comics)
- Mina Tepeş (Dance in the Vampire Bund)
- Misaki Minato (Blood Alone)
- Miyu Yamano (Vampire Princess Miyu)
- Moka Akashiya (Rosario+Vampire)
- The Monk (Detective Comics)
- Morbius, the Living Vampire (Spider-Man)
- Mordicus (PhD: Phantasy Degree)
- Nazuna Nanakusa (Call of the Night)
- Nukesaku (JoJo's Bizarre Adventure)
- Noé Archiviste (The Case Study of Vanitas)
- Nozomu Moegi (Crescent Moon)
- Pearl Jones (American Vampire)
- Porrim Maryam (Homestuck)
- Proinsias Cassidy (Preacher)
- Ragamuffin (Lenore, the Cute Little Dead Girl)
- Reiri Kamura (Kaibutsu Oujo)
- Ren Maaka (Chibi Vampire light novels)
- Richarz (Blood Lad)
- Rido Kuran (Vampire Knight)
- Rima Toya (Vampire Knight)
- Rip van Winkle (Hellsing)
- Ruka Souen (Vampire Knight)
- Saya Otonashi (Blood+/Blood: The Last Vampire)
- Senri Shiki (Vampire Knight)
- Seras Victoria (Hellsing)'
- Seri Kikiyou (Call of the Night)
- Skeeter (DC Comics)
- Skinner Sweet (American Vampire)
- Sophie Twilight (Ms. Vampire Who Lives in My Neighborhood)
- Spike (Buffy comics/Buffyverse comics/Angel comics)
- Spitfire (Marvel Comics)
- Staz Charlie Blood (Blood Lad)
- Straizo (JoJo's Bizarre Adventure)
- Subaru (Tsubasa: Reservoir Chronicle)
- Sunako Kirishiki (Shiki series)
- Takuma Ichijo (Vampire Knight)
- Trampire (Dr. Slump)
- Vampire by Night (Marvel Comics)
- Vampirella (Vampirella)
- Vanilla Ice (JoJo's Bizarre Adventure)
- Varnae (Marvel Comics)
- Veronica Lodge (Vampironica)
- Vic Vampire (Bug-a-Booo)
- Vicente (30 Days of Night)
- Vincent Velcro (Creature Commandos)
- Walter C. Dornez (Hellsing)
- Yuki Cross (Vampire Knight)
- Wired Beck (JoJo's Bizarre Adventure)
- Yuriya Tachibana (Chibi Vampire)
- Zorin Blitz (Hellsing)
- Zero Kiryu (Vampire Knight)

== Video games, board games, card games, and product placement ==
A

- Alistair Grout (Vampire: The Masquerade – Bloodlines
- Alucard (Castlevania series)
- Alcina Dimitrescu (Resident Evil Village)
- Amelia Thorn (Vampire: The Masquerade – Bloodlines 2)
- Amy Sorel (Soul series)
- Arcueid Brunestud (Tsukihime)
- Ash Rivers (Vampire: The Masquerade – Bloodlines)
- Astarion Ancunín (Baldur's Gate 3)
- Augustus Giovanni (Vampire: The Masquerade)
- Ayato Sakamaki (Diabolik Lovers)
- Azusa Mukami (Diabolik Lovers)

B

- Barabus (Vampire: The Masquerade – Bloodlines)
- Beckett (Vampire: The Masquerade – Bloodlines)
- Benny Muldoon (Vampire: The Masquerade – Bloodlines 2)
- Bertram Tung (Vampire: The Masquerade – Bloodlines)
- Bishop Vick (Vampire: The Masquerade – Bloodlines)
- Members of the Blood Angels Space Marine Chapter (Warhammer 40,000)
- Bodhi (Baldur's Gate II: Shadows of Amn)
- Brauner (Castlevania: Portrait of Ruin)
- Brother Kanker (Vampire: The Masquerade – Bloodlines)

C

- Caldaur (King's Quest II: Romancing the Stones)
- Carmilla (Castlevania series)
- Cassetti (Limbus Company)
- Cazador Szarr (Baldur's Gate 3)
- Christof Romuald (Vampire: The Masquerade – Redemption)
- Closure (Arknights)
- Count Chocula (Monster Cereals by General Mills)
- Curiambro (Limbus Company)

D

- Dalv (Undertale Yellow)
- Damsel (Vampire: The Masquerade – Bloodlines)
- Demitri Maximoff (Darkstalkers)
- Dettlaff van der Eretein (The Witcher 3: Wild Hunt)
- Don Quixote (Limbus Company)
- Dracula (Castlevania series)
- The Drifter (Deadlock)
- Dulcinea (Limbus Company)
- Dumah (Legacy of Kain: Soul Reaver)

E

- Ecaterina the Wise (Vampire: The Masquerade – Redemption)
- Edgar Markov (Magic: the Gathering)
- Elena (Library of Ruina)
- Eliza (Tekken Revolution and Tekken 7)
- Emiel Regis Rohellec Terzieff-Godefroy (The Witcher 3: Wild Hunt)
- Erika Sendo (Fortune Arterial)

F

- Fabien Laguna (Vampire: The Masquerade – Bloodlines 2)
- Ferril (BloodRayne 2)
- Flandre Scarlet (Touhou Project)
- Fletcher (Vampire: The Masquerade – Bloodlines 2)

G

- Gary Golden (Vampire: The Masquerade – Bloodlines)
- Gabriel Belmont (Castlevania: Lords of Shadow)
- Gideon Hall (Vampire: The Masquerade – Bloodlines 2)

H

- Harkon (The Elder Scrolls V: Skyrim – Dawnguard)
- Hexxat (Baldur's Gate II: Enhanced Edition)
- Hildegard Valentine (Shadow Hearts: From the New World)
- Howell Sonavact (Carilaine: The Crimson Verdict)

I

- Imalia (Vampire: The Masquerade – Bloodlines)
- Iori Sendo (Fortune Arterial)
- Isaac Abrams (Vampire: The Masquerade – Bloodlines)

J

- Janos Audron (Legacy of Kain)
- Janus Hassildor (The Elder Scrolls IV: Oblivion)
- Jeanette Voerman (Vampire: The Masquerade – Bloodlines)
- Jezebel Locke (Vampire: The Masquerade – Bloodlines)
- JJ Campbell (Vampire: The Masquerade – Bloodlines 2)
- Joachim Armster (Castlevania: Lament of Innocence)
- Joachim Valentine (Shadow Hearts: Covenant)
- Dr. Jonathan Reid (Vampyr)

K

- Kain (Legacy of Kain)
- Kanato Sakamaki (Diabolik Lovers)
- Katrina (Quest for Glory: Shadows of Darkness)
- Katsumi Ishizaka (Vampire: The Masquerade – Bloodlines 2)
- Keith Valentine (Shadow Hearts)
- Kagan (BloodRayne and BloodRayne 2)
- Kishua Zelretch Schweinorg (Type-Moon)
- Kojou Akatsuki (Dengeki Bunko: Fighting Climax)
- Kou Mukami (Diabolik Lovers)

L

- Laito Sakamaki (Diabolik Lovers)
- Lamae Bal (formerly Beolfag, The Elder Scrolls)
- Laura (Castlevania series)
- Liam de Lioncourt (Monster Prom)
- Loretta Lecarde (Castlevania: Portrait of Ruin)
- Lou Graham (Vampire: The Masquerade – Bloodlines 2)
- Lowerniel Drakan (RuneScape)

M

- Maderas (Disgaea: Hour of Darkness)
- Magnus (Blood Omen 2)
- Max Webber (Vampire: The Masquerade – Bloodlines 2)
- Maximillian Strauss (Vampire: The Masquerade – Bloodlines)
- Melchiah (Legacy of Kain: Soul Reaver)
- Michael "Tolly" Tolliver (Vampire: The Masquerade – Bloodlines 2)
- Mira Fallegeros (Killer Instinct)
- Mina Ha (Deadlock)
- Mitnick (Vampire: The Masquerade – Bloodlines)
- Mona De Lafitte (A Vampyre Story)
- Mordoc SeLanmere (Baldur's Gate: Dark Alliance II)
- Mortis (Brawl Stars)

N

- Nagoriyuki (Guilty Gear Strive)
- Neclord (Suikoden, Suikoden 2)
- Nicolina (Limbus Company)
- Night Shift (Skylanders: Swap Force)
- Night of Wallachia (Melty Blood)
- Niko Angelov (Vampire: The Masquerade – Bloodlines 2)
- Nines Rodriguez (Vampire: The Masquerade – Bloodlines)
- Nitara (Mortal Kombat: Deadly Alliance)
- Nosferatu (Library of Ruina)

O

- Onda Cardoso (Vampire: The Masquerade – Bloodlines 2)

P

- Patience Boswell (Vampire: The Masquerade – Bloodlines 2)
- Pisha (Vampire: The Masquerade – Bloodlines)

R

- Rachel Alucard (BlazBlue)
- Rahab (Legacy of Kain: Soul Reaver)
- Ranis Drakan (RuneScape)
- Raphael Sorel (Soul series)
- Rayne (BloodRayne)
- Raziel (Legacy of Kain)
- Reiji Sakamaki (Diabolik Lovers)
- Remilia Scarlet (Touhou Project)
- Rosalind Emmerson (Vampire: The Masquerade – Bloodlines 2)
- Ruki Mukami (Diabolik Lovers)
- Ryong Choi (Vampire: The Masquerade – Bloodlines 2)

S

- Safia Ulusoy (Vampire: The Masquerade – Bloodlines 2)
- Sancho (Limbus Company)
- Sasha (Limbus Company)
- Satsuki Yumizuka (Tsukihime)
- Saulot (Vampire The Masquerade)
- Sebastian LaCroix (Vampire: The Masquerade – Bloodlines)
- Serana (The Elder Scrolls V: Skyrim – Dawnguard)
- Shū Sakamaki (Diabolik Lovers)
- Silky Ladock (Vampire: The Masquerade – Bloodlines 2)
- Sion Eltnam Atlasia (Melty Blood)
- Skelter (Vampire: The Masquerade – Bloodlines)
- Slayer (Guilty Gear)
- Smiling Jack (Vampire: The Masquerade – Bloodlines)
- Sorin Markov (Magic: The Gathering)
- Stella Lecarde (Castlevania: Portrait of Ruin)
- Strahd von Zarovich (Ravenloft, Advanced Dungeons and Dragons)
- Subaru Sakamaki (Diabolik Lovers)
- Sabrina Dracula (Castlevania)
- Semmelweis (Reverse 1999)

T

- Therese Voerman (Vampire: The Masquerade – Bloodlines)
- Trevor Belmont (Castlevania)
- Turel (Legacy of Kain)

U

- Umah (Blood Omen 2)

V

- Vamp (Metal Gear)
- Valerica (The Elder Scrolls V: Skyrim – Dawnguard)
- Valvatorez (Disgaea 4: A Promise Unforgotten)
- Vanarhost (Champions of Norrath)
- Vanescula Drakan (RuneScape)
- Vanstrom Klause (RuneScape)
- Velvet Velour (Vampire: The Masquerade – Bloodlines)
- Verzik Vitur (Old School RuneScape)
- Vincent Dorin (Castlevania: Portrait of Ruin)
- Vladimir (League of Legends)
- Vorador (Legacy of Kain)
- Vincent Valentine (Final Fantasy VII)

W

- Walter Bernhard (Castlevania: Lament of Innocence)
- Warfarin (Arknights)
- Willem Axel (Vampire: The Masquerade – Bloodlines 2)

X

- Xanhast (Baldur's Gate: Dark Alliance II)

Y

- Ysabella Moore (Vampire: The Masquerade – Bloodlines 2)
- Yuma Mukami (Diabolik Lovers)

Z

- Zephon (Legacy of Kain: Soul Reaver)

== Musicals, opera and theatre ==
- Alan Raby (The Phantom)
- Alfred (Tanz der Vampire)
- Amandine (Uptown Halloween)
- Armand (Lestat)
- Carmilla (Illness or Modern Women)
- Claudia (Lestat)
- Count Aubri (Der Vampyr)
- Count Dracula (Dracula, the Musical and Dracula)
- Count von Krolock (Tanz der Vampire)
- Emily (Illness or Modern Women)
- Gabrielle (Lestat)
- Feddy (Lestat)
- Herbert von Krolock (Tanz der Vampire)
- Laurant (Lestat)
- Lestat de Lioncourt (Lestat)
- Lord Ruthven (Der Vampyr, The Vampire, The Vampyre)
- Lucy Westenra (Dracula, the Musical)
- Louis de Pointe du Lac (Lestat)
- Madelaine Astarte/Madelaine Andrews (Vampire Lesbians of Sodom)
- Magda (Tanz der Vampire)
- Magnus (Lestat)
- Nicolas de Lenfent (Lestat)
- Sarah Shagal/Chagal (Tanz der Vampire)
- Yoine Shagal/Chagal (Tanz der Vampire)

== See also ==
- Gothic fiction
- List of vampire films
- List of vampire television series
- Vampire literature
- Vampire film
