= Daywalker (disambiguation) =

"Daywalker!" is a song by Machine Gun Kelly featuring Corpse Husband.

Daywalker may also refer to:

== Characters ==
- A designation for Marvel Comics characters Blade and Drake (Dracula)
  - Blade (New Line Blade franchise character)
  - Blade (Marvel Cinematic Universe)
- A designation for vampires or half vampires who are not vulnerable to sunlight:
  - Vampire Princess Miyu
  - Hazuki, main character in the Japanese anime and manga series Tsukuyomi: Moon Phase
  - Vampires in the Japanese light novel, anime and manga series High School DxD

== Music ==
- Daywalker, a stage name used by German producer and DJ Gary D. (Gerald Malke, born 1964)
- "Daywalker", a song from the album Chasm by Delta-S
- "Daywalker", a song from the album Fire at Zero Gravity by 40 Below Summer
- "Daywalkers", a song from the album Crimson Cord by Propaganda
- "Daywalkers", a track from the soundtrack album Trinity

== Nickname ==
- Peggy Morgan (born 1981), nicknamed Daywalker, American mixed martial artist

== Other uses ==
- "The Daywalker", a comedy series by Trevor Noah
- A name for people with red hair who don't have pale skin and freckles, used in the South Park episode "Ginger Kids"

== See also ==
- Margie Day (1926–2014), American singer also known as Day Walker
- Dhampir
