= Suck It Up =

Suck it Up may refer to:

== Film and television ==
- "Suck It Up", a season 4 episode of Billy the Exterminator
- "Suck It Up!", a season 2 episode of Happy Tree Friends

== Songs ==
- "Suck It Up", by Frankie Goes to Hollywood from Inside the Pleasuredome, 2014
- "Suck It Up", by Magnapop from Rubbing Doesn't Help, 1996
- "Suck It Up", by She Wants Revenge from Valleyheart, 2011
- "Suck It Up", by Bloodsimple from Red Harvest, 2007
- "Suck It Up, Princess", by Ten Second Epic from Count Yourself In, 2006
- "Suck It Up", by 40 Below Summer from the DVD release of The Last Dance, 2006
- "Suck It Up", by Jo Hikk from Ride, 2009
- "Suck It Up", by Adam Richman
- "Suck It Up", by Jennifer Parkin's project Ayria, from Hearts for Bullets, 2008
- "Suck It Up", by Sean Hogan, 2009
- "Suck It Up", by Die Warzau from Big Electric Metal Bass Face, 1991
- "Suck It Up", by Wesley Geer included in the soundtrack for Madden NFL 2003

== Other uses ==
- Suck It Up (novel), by Brian Meehl, 2008
- Suck It Up (film), a 2017 Canadian comedy-drama film
- Vacuum Panic, a.k.a. Suck It Up, winner of the 2012 British Academy Children's Awards for Young Game Designers: Game Concept
