= Kiss of the Vampire =

Kiss of the Vampire may refer to:

- The Kiss of the Vampire, a 1916 film
- Kiss of the Vampire (film), a 1963 film by Don Sharp
- Kiss of the Vampire, also titled Immortally Yours, a 2009 film by Joe Tornatore
- Kiss of the Vampire, a novel by Francine Pascal

== See also ==
- Vampire's Kiss, a 1989 film with Nicolas Cage
- Vampire Kisses (series), a series of books written by Ellen Schreiber
  - Vampire Kisses (novel), the first book of Ellen Schreiber's series
- O Beijo do Vampiro, a Brazilian telenovela (titled "The Kiss of the Vampire" in Portuguese)
- I Kissed a Vampire, a vampire rock musical web series
- Castlevania: Dracula X, a 1995 videogame by Konami released as Castlevania: Vampire's Kiss in Europe
