= Jeaniene Frost =

American fantasy author (born 1974)

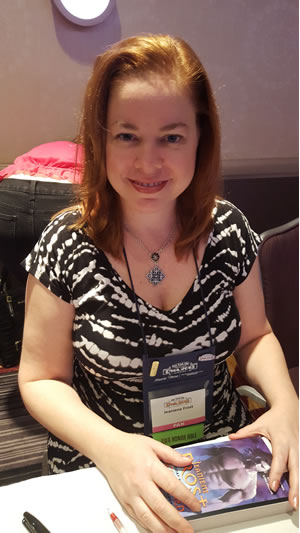
- Frost at the Romance Writers of America Conference, July 2015, New York, NY
- Born: June 13, 1974 (age 52); United States
- Spouse: Matthew Frost
- Writing career
- Language: English
- Period: 2007–present
- Genres: Romance; Science fiction Fantasy
- Notable works: Halfway to the Grave; Eternal Kiss of Darkness
- Website: jeanienefrost.com

Jeaniene Frost (born June 13, 1974) is an American fantasy author, known for her Night Huntress series and the Night Huntress World novels. Foreign rights for her novels have sold to twenty countries.

== Bibliography ==
=== Night Huntress ===
Night Huntress is a completed urban fantasy/paranormal romance series published by the Avon imprint of HarperCollins Publishers between 2008 and 2014. The story follows Catherine "Cat" Crawfield, a snarky, conflicted half-vampire college student who moonlights as a vampire hunter in a small Ohio town. Her path collides with a sexy and mysterious vampire bounty hunter named Bones, who alters her views on the undead world for good. Later books follow Cat and Bones as they navigate their relationship and the dangers of the undead world.

The series inspired multiple spin-offs (Night Huntress World, Night Prince, and Night Rebel), plus retellings of the first two original books from Bones' point of view (POV).

Series order	Title	Release date	Publisher	ISBN	Notes
0.5	"The Reckoning"	August 25, 2009	Avon	ISBN 9780062106322	Also included in anthology Unbound
1	Halfway to the Grave	October 30, 2007	Avon	ISBN 9780061245084	
1.5	"Happily Never After"	May 28, 2008 July 19, 2011	Avon	ISBN 9780062106346	Originally appeared in Weddings From Hell anthology
2	One Foot in the Grave	April 29, 2008	Avon	ISBN 0-06-124509-7	
3	At Grave's End	December 30, 2008	Avon	ISBN 0-06-158307-3	
3.5	Devil to Pay	June 30, 2009 August 23, 2011	Avon	ISBN 0-062-10633-3	Originally published in Four Dukes and a Devil anthology
4	Destined for an Early Grave	July 28, 2009	Avon	ISBN 0-06-158321-9	
4.5	One for the Money	August 3, 2010	NYLA	ISBN 978-1-943-77259-9	Also published in Death's Excellent Vacation
5	This Side Of The Grave	February 22, 2011	Avon	ISBN 0-06-178318-8	
6	One Grave at a Time	August 30, 2011	Avon	ISBN 0-06-178319-6	
6.5	Home for the Holidays	October 25, 2011 November 5, 2013	Avon	ISBN 9780062322043	Originally appeared in the print anthology The Bite Before Christmas.
7	Up from the Grave	January 28, 2014	Avon	ISBN 0-06-207611-6	
7.5	Outtakes from the Grave	December 22, 2015	NYLA	ISBN 9781519762429	Anthology of outtakes and never before published scenes from books 1 to 4 of the series
7.6	Grave Girls' Getaway	July 1, 2021 January 4, 2022	Avon	ISBN 9781641971935	Originally published in Hex on the Beach anthology

==== Bones' POV ====
Series order	Title	Release Date	Publisher	ISBN	Notes
1	The Other Half of the Grave	April 26, 2022	NYLA	ISBN 979-8-433-28080-9	Initially serialized on author's website
2	Both Feet in the Grave	April 18, 2023	NYLA	ISBN 978-1-641-97243-7	

==== Night Huntress World ====
Series order	Title	Release date	Publisher	ISBN
1	First Drop of Crimson	February 9, 2010	Avon	ISBN 0-06-158322-7
2	Eternal Kiss of Darkness	July 27, 2010	Avon	ISBN 0-06-178316-1

==== Night Prince ====
Series order	Title	Release date	Publisher	ISBN
1	Once Burned	June 26, 2012	Avon	ISBN 0-06-178320-X
2	Twice Tempted	March 26, 2013	Avon	ISBN 0-06-207610-8
3	Bound by Flames	January 27, 2015	Avon	ISBN 0-06-207608-6
4	Into the Fire	February 28, 2017	Avon	ISBN 978-0062076403

==== Night Rebel ====
Series order	Title	Release date	Publisher	ISBN
1	Shades of Wicked	October 30, 2018	Avon	ISBN 978-0-062-69561-1
2	Wicked Bite	January 28, 2020	Avon	ISBN 978-0-062-69563-5
3	Wicked All Night	February 23, 2021	Avon	ISBN 978-0-062-69566-6

=== Broken Destiny ===
Series order	Title	Release date	Publisher	ISBN
1	The Beautiful Ashes	August 26, 2014	HQN	ISBN 0-373-77905-4
2	The Sweetest Burn	June 27, 2017	HQN	ISBN 978-0373779710
3	The Brightest Embers	November 28, 2017	HQN	ISBN 978-0373789429

=== Beautiful and Beastly ===
Series order	Title	Release date	Publisher	ISBN
1	A Curse of Beasts and Magic	May 26, 2026	Bramble	ISBN 978-1250396006
2	A Storm of Dragons and Sorcery	March 2, 2027 (forthcoming)	Bramble	ISBN 978-1250395931

=== Anthologies and other works ===
- Pack (March 9, 2009)
- Night's Darkest Embrace (October 26, 2010)

== Adaptations ==
The Night Huntress and Night Huntress World novels have been adapted by Graphic Audio. Adaptations of the Bones' POV novels are in progress as of fall 2026.

== Critical reception ==
Frost's novels have garnered mostly positive reviews and have been well received by critics and she has had multiple New York Times bestsellers. Her first novel Halfway to the Grave (2007) won the Romantic Times Reviewers' Choice Award (RT Award) in the Urban Fantasy category, Eternal Kiss of Darkness (2010) and Once Burned (2012) won the Romantic Times Reviewers' Choice Awards for Best Vampire Romance, and the final book in the Night Huntress series Up From the Grave (2014) won the Romantic Times Reviewers' Choice Award for Best Urban Fantasy Worldbuilding.
