= Priscilla Hamby =

American illustrator and comic book artist

- Born: August 5, 1982 (age 44); Texas
- Occupations: Illustrator, Comic Book Artist
- Partner: Clint Bickham
- Writing career
- Pen name: Rem
- Website: www.blackmoontides.com

Priscilla Hamby (born August 5, 1982) is an American illustrator and comic book artist. She specializes in Japanese manga style comics and uses the pen name Rem when published. She lives in Houston, Texas where graduated from the University of Houston Fine Arts Program in 2003.

Her break was in Tokyopop's first Rising Stars of Manga competition in 2003 as the Grand Prize winner for her work Devil's Candy. She then went on to do 2D character and environment designs on a video game called Fate of Ages by a now defunct company in England called Onisoft. In 2006 she became the artist for a collaborative project between Tokyopop and HarperCollins. The project was a manga adaptation of a series of novels written by Ellen Schreiber called Vampire Kisses. The subsequent manga series, Vampire Kisses: Blood Relatives is a spin-off of Schreiber's previous works. There are two volumes of Blood Relatives in publication. In 2007, she won grand prize in the Kodansha Weekly Morning International Manga Competition for her work Kage no Matsuri and as a result her short story was published in Morning Two magazine. She also worked on Tokyopop's Domo: The Manga. In 2012, she illustrated a 3 volume series called Soulless: The Manga for Yen Press, which was an adaptation of Gail Carriger's novels. In 2015, her oneshot manga Folie À Deux was published on Shonen Jump+ and digital version of Weekly Shonen Jump. In July 2019, she announced that she did some of the character designs for River City Girls video game by Arc Systems Works and WayForward which will be released in September 2019.

She was as of 2019 working on the Devil's Candy webcomic with Bikkuri.
