= Vampire Kisses =

Book series by Ellen Schreiber

- Author: Ellen Schreiber
- Country: United States
- Language: English
- Genre: Fantasy, young adult fiction
- Publisher: HarperCollins
- Published: 2003 - May 15, 2012
- Media type: Print
- No. of books: 9

Vampire Kisses is a series of books written by Ellen Schreiber.

The first book in the series, Vampire Kisses, was one of the American Library Association's young adult book picks for 2004.

== Plot Synopsis ==
Vampire Kisses is about a 16-year-old girl named Raven Madison who is a goth misfit in her polo-wearing, ordinary, town. When an old abandoned mansion finally gets new residents, rumors start to spread. Everyone in the small town, which Raven refers to as “Dullsville”, believes that the new neighbors are actually secret bloodthirsty vampires. Even Raven, who has always loved vampires since she was little, believes the rumors. But one day, she encounters the attractive yet mysterious Alexander Sterling that lives in the mansion and feels like he is the only person that actually understands her. The two very quickly fall in love, but still, the question remains; are the Sterlings really vampires?

== Books in series ==
1. Vampire Kisses
2. Kissing Coffins
3. Vampireville
4. Dance With a Vampire
5. The Coffin Club
6. Royal Blood
7. Love Bites
8. Cryptic Cravings
9. Immortal Hearts

Vampire Kisses: Blood Relatives series

Vampire Kisses: Graveyard Games series

== Reception ==
Critical reception for the Vampire Kisses series has been mixed to positive, with Teenreads calling the first book a "wonderfully funny story". Kirkus Reviews stated that the book was "cheesily written" but that it was "awkwardly endearing". Publishers Weekly praised the first novel, stating that while the ending was "a bit rushed, elsewhere the comic timing is dead-on". The Comic Book Bin reviewed Vampire Kisses, calling it a "breezy teen romance". The Magazine of Fantasy and Science Fiction praised Kissing Coffins, the second book in the series, writing "It's not a deep, dark read, so it might be too light for a die-hard Goth, but it's not dull by any means." The Horn Book Guide panned the series' 8th volume, stating "purple prose and little real tension are strikes against this tale of goth-girl wish fulfillment".

Anime News Network reviewed volume one of the manga adaptation Blood Relatives, criticizing the series' "irksome clichés" but praising artist Rem's artwork.

== Manga adaptation ==
In 2007 a manga adaptation of Schreiber's Vampire Kisses series was published by Tokyopop's English branch, with the series eventually being published in German as well. Tokyopop chose artist Rem to illustrate the series, with the artist previously winning their 2003 Rising Stars of Manga contest. Rem was responsible for volumes one and two, while volume three was illustrated by Elisa Kwon. A fourth volume, entitled "Vampire Kisses: Graveyard Games", was later released in 2011, illustrated by Xian Nu Studio.

The series was one of the 2009 New York Times bestselling manga for the week of September 26.

=== Volume list ===
No.	North American release date	North American ISBN
1	September 25, 2007	978-0-06-134081-9
2	September 9, 2008	978-0-06-134082-6
3	September 8, 2009	978-0-06-134083-3
4	September 27, 2011	978-0062026729

== Character descriptions ==
=== Raven Madison ===
Raven Madison, the 16-year-old goth daughter of Sarah and Paul Madison and elder sister of Billy (Nerd Boy) Madison, is known for being the only gothic girl in all of Dullsville. She has mid-length jet black hair. Her favorite color is black; her favorite movies of all time are Dracula and Kissing Coffins. She lives in a town called "Dullsville" and has a best friend named Becky Miller whom she has known since the third grade when she saw Becky crying on the front steps one day because she thought that her mom forgot to pick her up.

When Raven is pretty young, she decides that her lifelong arch-nemesis is Trevor Mitchell because he hates Raven and she terms it as hate at first sight. They go out of their way to humiliate each other. On her 16th birthday, a mystery family moves into a creepy mansion in her town and they become her point of obsession. She devotes all of her time to find out if they are really vampires or not and breaks into the mansion one day after a disastrous run-in with the Creepy butler (Jameson) on Halloween. Raven first saw her future boyfriend Alexander Sterling, who she nicknamed "Gothic Guy", on the night of her classmate Matt's party.

=== Alexander Sterling ===
Alexander Sterling, son of Constantine & Cassandra Sterling, is a vampire in Ellen Schreiber's Vampire Kisses series. He is known to have dark brown eyes, to have long jet-black hair, and to be an excellent painter. He moved into the mansion on Benson Hill during his future girlfriend Raven Madison's sophomore year. He first met Raven when he was leaving the cemetery painting by his grandmother's grave when Becky Miller almost ran him over with her truck.

=== Trevor Mitchell ===
Trevor Mitchell is Raven's popular, khaki-clad, rich, gorgeous, and mean arch-nemesis. But truth is, he's more attracted to her than repelled by her. He's had a crush on her ever since they were children. Trevor even kept the one present Raven ever got him. He goes out of his way to humiliate her but is just wanting her attention. He nicknamed Raven his "Monster Girl." While Raven hates him truly, Trevor is Raven's secret admirer. Trevor steals Raven's first kiss at Matt's party. He dresses up as a vampire on Halloween to impress Raven because he knows she loves vampires and also he plans to spray paint the Mansion and blame it on Raven for humiliating him. He even buys the painting of Raven which was put for auction by Alexander to pay money for buying the mansion.

Ultimately he ends up confessing his love for Raven only to see her become a vampire.
