= The Dark Heroine =

The Dark Heroine is a series of vampire-themed fantasy romance novels written by English author Abigail Gibbs, published by HarperCollins in 2012. The first novel in the series, Dinner with a Vampire, revolves around London-born Violet Lee, who is kidnapped and held hostage by a Royal Family of vampires known as the Varns. The series is told from both Violet Lee and Kaspar Varn's perspective, the latter being heir to the Vamperic Throne in the novel.

Dinner with a Vampire, the first book of the Dark Heroine series, was first published under the pseudonym Canse12 on "Wattpad", a website that is dedicated to the reading and sharing of stories. Dinner's Wattpad reception, nearly 17 million readers, led to then eighteen year old Gibbs receiving a publishing deal with HarperCollins.

A second novel, 'Autumn Rose was published on 28 January 2014. A third was scheduled, but its status is unknown.
