= Ellen Schreiber =

American young adult fiction author

- Born: United States
- Occupation: Author
- Children: 3
- Writing career
- Period: 2002 - present
- Genre: Young adult fiction
- Notable work: Vampire Kisses Series
- Website: ellenschreiber.com

Ellen Schreiber is an American young adult fiction author.

== Biography ==
Ellen Schreiber is a New York Times Best Selling author and former actress. She performed in a two-woman show before going on her own to become a stand-up comedian She studied Shakespearean theater at the Royal Academy of Dramatic Art in London and comedy at The Second City of Chicago, which is where she lived for five years. As a novelist she has had several works published in Europe and America. Her brother, Mark Schreiber, is also an author. He helped her start her writing career. The Vampire Kisses series was her first popular book series. It stars Raven, a goth girl who has wanted to be a vampire since she was little, and Alexander Sterling, a vampire who loves to paint.

Ellen has started writing another book series known as Once in a Full Moon based on a human girl Celeste who falls for Brandon who is a human that turns into a wolf at night. The series ended in 2012 with a total of 3 books.

== Vampire Kisses series ==
The Vampire Kisses series is about a high school goth girl named Raven Madison, who lives in a boring town that she calls "Dullsville". Raven finds out that a boy who has recently moved to her town is a vampire and falls in love with him. The series was continued into a manga series entitled Blood Relatives.

- Vampire Kisses (2003)
- Vampire Kisses II: Kissing Coffins (2005)
- Vampire Kisses III: Vampireville (2006)
- Vampire Kisses IV: Dance with a Vampire (2007)
- Vampire Kisses V: The Coffin Club (2008)
- Vampire Kisses VI: Royal Blood (2009)
- Vampire Kisses VII: Love Bites (2010)
- Vampire Kisses VIII: Cryptic Cravings (2011)
- Vampire Kisses IX: Immortal Hearts (2012)

== Other young adult fiction ==
- Johnny Lightning
- Teenage Mermaid (2003)
- Comedy Girl (2004)

=== Once In A Full Moon (series) ===
- Once In A Full Moon (2010)
- Magic Of The Moonlight (December 2011)
- Full Moon Kisses (December 26, 2012)
