= Crescent Moon (manga) =

Japanese manga series

- Cover of Crescent Moon volume 1 as published by Kadokawa Shoten

未完の月 (Mikan no Tsuki)
- Genre: Fantasy
- Manga
- Written by: Haruko Iida
- Published by: Kadokawa Shoten
- English publisher: NA: Tokyopop
- Magazine: Asuka
- Original run: 1999 – 2001
- Volumes: 6

Crescent Moon (Japanese: 未完の月, Hepburn: Mikan no Tsuki) is the English title of the shōjo manga Mikan no Tsuki (literally An Incomplete Moon)), written by Haruko Iida in partnership with Red Company. It was originally published by Kadokawa Shoten beginning in 1999 and serialized in Asuka Comics, and it was translated into English by Tokyopop. It is collected in six volumes.

== Story ==
The plot deals with Mahiru Shiraishi, a young woman with the ability to grant others good fortune by touching them. She herself does not benefit from this good fortune, and occasionally laments that this is because she has given all of her luck away to others.

Mahiru begins to have recurring dreams of a demon, and these dreams soon lead to her becoming entangled with the "Lunar Race" — a collection of creatures of folklore such as vampires, werewolves, kitsune, and tengu. These creatures' powers are related to the phase of the moon, strongest when the moon is full and weakest when it is new.

Mahiru learns that she is the "Descendant of the Princess" and that the members of the Lunar Race she has encountered, known as the Moonlight Bandits, need her help to recover the "Teardrops of the Moon," the source of their power. In the process, she attempts to heal the rift that has developed between humans and the Lunar Race, and bring the two closer together.

== Characters ==
=== Mahiru Shiraishi ===
The main protagonist of the story, she is a seemingly ordinary high school junior with the ability to bring out the hidden abilities of the "Lunar Race". She has been "gifted" with the ability to distribute good luck to the people around her. Mahiru is good-natured, always seeing the best in people, and strong-willed. She loves to swim, and her hobby is to collect little plush aquatic animal toys, such as dolphins, fish and clams. Her personal name means "midday" and her family name means "white rock ".

Marhiru was born on June 29 and is 17 years old. Mahiru had a normal life until she was in elementary school, when her parents died in a car accident. She was raised by her aunt. According to her aunt, Mahiru never asked for a single thing in her younger ages, and is always constantly worrying about what other people think of her.

When she meets the Moonlight Bandits, she learns that she is a descendant of a mythological princess and has special powers that aide the Moonlight Bandits in their search for the Teardrops of the Moon. She grew very close to them while they searched for the Teardrops of the Moon, and while searching for the final Teardrop, she and Mitsuru become a couple. She becomes a waitress at the bar The Moonshine Cafe.

=== Mitsuru Suou ===
Mitsuru is a tengu. He has aqua colored hair and a hostile personality. His major abilities are controlling wind and lightning, as well as the power to fly. He also can't swim. His first name means "full" while his last name means "sweated "

He's 17 years old, but his birth date and place are unknown. Mitsuru, unlike the rest of the Moonlight Bandits, had been raised by humans. When the humans betrayed him, he vowed that he would one day kill the entire human race. He wandered through Japan for years, and it was only until he was 16 that he met and became one of the Moonlight Bandits. Because he grew up with humans, he has no idea what his clan's weaknesses are and is not used to his transformation. Until he learns to control his power, Mitsuru transforms every time he touches Mahiru, or vice versa. Along with this transformation comes an uncontrollable surge of anger.

When the group first meets Mahiru, he strongly objects being near her and shows his dislike. She is frightened by him, at first, and this bothers him, although he tries not to show it. After a while, though, he begins to warm up to her a little bit, and finally realizes that he loves her. When he shows his love, he finds that Mahiru feels the same way.

=== Nozomu Moegi ===
The second member of the Moonlight Bandits encountered by Mahiru, Nozomu is a suave and affectionate vampire who takes a shine to Mahiru. He loves the ladies and has an irresistible charm. A member of the Moonlight Bandits. His major power is using his bats to spy and talk to his comrades through. Although he has blond hair and blue eyes, he speaks with a thick Kansai accent. Being a vampire, he cannot eat solid foods, and sustains himself on soup and juice. He was born in Osaka. His first name means "desire" and his last name is "budding justice"

He is 19 years old and was born on September 27. He was the result of a vampire and a powerful demon, so he came to realize his powers at an early age. It is unsure when he joined the Moonlight Bandits. He meets Mahiru in the library, where she is checking out books about The Demon and the Minister of The Left. He also transforms when he first touches her, but controls it any other time, unlike Mitsuru.

=== Misoka Asagi ===
Misoka is a fox demon and the unspoken leader of the Moonlight Bandits. Level-headed and quick thinker, it has been hinted that Misoka is slightly sensitive about the fact that he's obscenely short. His greatest abilities are hypnosis and transformations. His first name means "the last day of the month", and his last name means "light blue". In the first volume released by Tokyopop, Misoka was mistakenly referred to as female. This was corrected in later volumes.

Misoka is 21 years old and was born on March 11. He was born and raised in the Moon Palace. When his mother died, he was raised by Oboro, so he was probably the first to join the Moonlight Bandits. He is also the only member to call Mahiru "Princess" other than Tsukiko when he is around Misoka. At the end of the series, Misoka meets up with his aunt, who is harsh and somewhat rude. He is known for his leadership and quick thinking in a situation

=== Akira Yamabuki ===
Akira is the fourth member of the Moonlight Bandits that Mahiru encounters. He is a happy-go-lucky werewolf who loathes dwelling on serious issues for too long. His major abilities are super-speed, super strength, and an amazing sense of smelling and hearing. He loves to cook, and is very skilled at it. His name means "bright" and "mountain rose." Later in the manga, he develops a crush on Keiko, Mahiru's classmate.

Akira is the youngest of the Moonlight Bandits, at sixteen years of age. Akira was born on December 4 in Northeastern Japan.. Even though Akira's parents died at a young age, the werewolf population where Akira lived was abundant, so Akira was raised happily with the love of his extended family. It is not known when Akira joined the Moonlight Bandits, but he seems to be very attached to them. He also seems to have taken a liking to Mahiru, like all of the others in the group.
