= Andrew Fox (author) =

American author from New Orleans

Andrew Fox is an American author from New Orleans. He has written three comic novels, Fat White Vampire Blues, Bride of the Fat White Vampire, and Fat White Vampire Otaku. These novels feature Jules Duchon, a morbidly obese vampire who resides in New Orleans and works as a taxi driver. The humor from the books is derived primarily from the embarrassing or dangerous predicaments that are at odds with the dignified, suave image one normally associates with vampires such as Dracula. In addition, Fox presents a well-thought out set of continuity rules that explain traditional vampire powers (e.g. the need for a vampire's mass to go somewhere when transforming into a form smaller than the original form). His novel, The Good Humor Man, or, Calorie 3501 published in 2009, while a satiric homage to Ray Bradbury's Fahrenheit 451, still contains elements of horror.

Fox and his family were out-of-state when Hurricane Katrina struck New Orleans. Like most residents, they were displaced by the storm. As part of the recovery efforts, Fox returned to the Commodity Supplemental Food Program, a federally funded nutrition program for low-income senior citizens and young families in the New Orleans area operated under the auspices of the Louisiana Office of Public Health, and later worked for the Federal Emergency Management Agency. Following the end of his employment with FEMA, Fox relocated to Northern Virginia.

In 2020 Fox wrote and published a collection of short stories, Hazardous Imaginings, subtitled The Mondo Book of Politically Incorrect Science Fiction! The title, an allusion to the 1967 anthology Dangerous Visions, edited by Harlan Ellison, established the book as an attempt to publish stories that would be considered too dangerous to be published in the current science fiction outlets. This was followed the same year by an anthology of stories by other writers, which Fox edited, titled Again, Hazardous Imaginings (again, an homage to Ellison's 1972 sequel, Again, Dangerous Visions); this sequel carried the subtitle More Politically Incorrect Science Fiction.

== Bibliography ==
- Fox, Andrew (2003). Fat White Vampire Blues. New York, NY: Ballantine Books. ISBN 0-345-46333-1.
- Fox, Andrew (2004). Bride of the Fat White Vampire. New York, NY: Ballantine Books. ISBN 0-345-46408-7.
- Fox, Andrew (2009). The Good Humor Man, Or, Calorie 3501. San Francisco, CA: Tachyon Publications. ISBN 978-1-892391-85-8.
- Fox, Andrew (2020). Hazardous Imaginings: The Mondo Book of Politically Incorrect Science Fiction. Manassas, VA: MonstraCity Press. ISBN 978-0-9898027-1-0.
- Fox, Andrew (2020). Again, Hazardous Imaginings: More Politically Incorrect Science Fiction (edited by Andrew Fox). Manassas, VA: MonstraCity Press. ISBN 978-0-9898027-4-1.
- Fox, Andrew (2021). Fat White Vampire Otaku. Manassas, VA: MonstraCity Press. ISBN 978-0-9898027-9-6.

== See also ==
- List of horror fiction authors
