= The Chronicles of Vladimir Tod =

Book series by Z Brewer

The Chronicles of Vladimir Tod Eleventh Grade Burns cover

The Chronicles of Vladimir Tod is a 5-book young adult series by Z Brewer. The first book, Eighth Grade Bites, was first published in 2007. The first three books sold over 200,000 copies. There was also a prequel series, The Slayer Chronicles.

== Eighth Grade Bites ==
The first book in the series, Eighth Grade Bites, follows main character Vladimir Tod's experiences in eighth grade as a vampire, with his best friend Henry (a human). The book is set in Bathory, a fictional town located somewhere in the United States.

Vladimir is a very misunderstood child who lost his parents three years ago in a tragic house fire, which he suspects to have been intentional. With the help of his aunt Nelly, he begins to search for clues to find the killer. But to make matters worse, he is a vampire who is just learning how to control his hunger for blood. While he embarks on a journey to get the answers, he finds that a man is on a mission to find and kill him as well. Vlad only wishes to learn more about his parents, but nothing can stop the man who wants his head.

== Ninth Grade Slays ==
In Ninth Grade Slays, the second book in the Vladimir Tod series, Vlad is just starting high school. In the beginning of the novel, Henry (Vlad's best friend and drudge) and Vlad (the half vampire/half-human protagonist of the story) welcome Henry's cousin, Joss, to their hometown of Bathory.

As they work their way through their freshman year of high school, Joss and Vlad become close friends. Joss develops a crush on Meredith Brookstone, the girl Vlad is in love with, going out with her for one dance. Initially, Joss is unaware of Vlad's love for Meredith, but later chooses not date her for the sake of his and Vlad's friendship.

Otis takes Vlad on a trip to Siberia where Vlad meets Vikas, both his uncle's and his father's teacher and friend. Vlad tells Vikas of his father's death and they hold a Pyre, a vampire funeral. Vikas then begins teaching Vlad to use his powers and tells him the story of the Pravus, the fabled half human/half vampire that would rule of Vampire kind and enslave the human race. Otis shows Vlad memories of Vlad's father and consents to teach Vlad to use his powers due to his disapproval of Vikas's teaching methods.

Shortly after returning from Siberia and to school, Joss decides to let Vlad in on his secret, that he is a Slayer and has been sent to Bathory to kill a vampire. At this point Joss still believes Vlad is human and asks that they search for the vampire together. D'Ablo, the vampire antagonist of the first book who was assumed dead, returns to attempt to kill Vlad. Vlad tells Joss about this and he agrees to help look for the vampire that attacked Vlad, together. When they meet in the clearing in the woods D'Ablo is there and Joss finds out that Vlad is a vampire, the vampire he was sent to kill. On top of that, it was D'Ablo who sent Joss and was controlling his mind to prevent him from realizing that D'Ablo was a vampire. Joss stakes Vlad and Vlad almost dies, but is saved by Otis and taken to the hospital. While Vlad is in the hospital Joss visits him and tells him that their friendship is over and leaves. When Vlad gets back to school he finds a note on his locker from Joss confirming that they are no longer friends. Vlad soon hears of this and starts to fall in love with Meredith.

== Tenth Grade Bleeds ==
Vlad returns to school for tenth grade and one day he saves a small goth boy named Sprat, who was being bullied by Bill and Tom. Later on Sprat's group of friends (Goth kids that hang out front of the high school at night that Vlad was eager to talk to but afraid to do so at first) came to Vlad's table at lunch to thank him for saving Sprat. Henry and Meredith, Vlad's girlfriend, disapproved of the goth kids so Vlad decided to go with them to the Crypt (A Gothic Club). Nelly tries giving the sex talk with Vlad, but he didn't want to listen. They both agreed that Otis will be the one to explain it to Vlad. Vlad has night terrors of a dark figure, and out of the shadow that surrounded it appear a silver blade. Moonlight glinted off its razor sharp surface, the man plunged the blade downward, ripping it through Vlad's stomach. Later on he finds out that the dreams are from Otis who was captured by D’Ablo.

Henry and Vlad end up separating from their friendship, demanding Vlad undo the bond between them. When Vlad goes with them he meets a beautiful girl named Snow. After saving Snow from her abusive father, he sinks his teeth into her neck, sucking her almost dry and making her drop to the ground. Vlad leaves her there; he is scared and at the same times, wants more of her blood. Later he calls Henry, sobbing while asking for help. Vlad and Henry end up friends and vampire/drudge again. Both going to face D’ablo and give the journal to him. While walking only ten steps Henry lets out a scream and Vlad turns to see Ignatius, the vampire who'd attacked him before, had Henry by a fistful of hair. A sharp, curved blade was pressed dangerously close to Henry's throat.

Later on finding out that Ignatius is none other than his own grandfather, who wants to kill Vlad and bring honor back to his family's name. D'Ablo goes and ties Vlad up to a chair and gags him. Later, Vlad gets free. D’Ablo got away after Vlad burnt his hand off. Otis returns to Nelly's house with Vlad and Henry waiting upon the letter from Vikas stating otherwise. At the Freedom Fest Vlad breaks up with Meredith to save her from himself, and goes to the back ally where he once bit into Snow's neck and meets her there. Finally, Vlad bites into her neck because she is now his drudge. they meet frequently for some days. The book ends with a letter that Vlad was supposed to get a while back containing Otis's teaching on writing in Elysian Code.

== Eleventh Grade Burns ==
Joss returns to Bathory, to finish the job he started during freshman year. When Vlad finds out Joss is returning, Vlad talks to his uncle, Otis, about not killing Joss because he still thinks of Joss as a friend. On the last day of summer multiple vampires come to Vlad's house to celebrate Otis's life. That's when Vlad meets Cratus, Dorian and several other unnamed vampires. Vlad finds out that Dorian has a taste for vampire blood. During this event we learn that D'Ablo got on the council of elders. At the end of the first day of school Vlad learns from Otis that Vikas will teach Vlad all he knows about the Slayer Society, and until Vlad is proficient, he is still required to do his homework.

On the fifth day of school, Eddie Poe pays the school bullies to bring Vlad to him after school. The bullies duct tape Vlad to a tree and Eddie puts a necklace of garlic around his neck. Eddie then cuts open his hand with a knife to see if Vlad is a vampire. Joss shows up and takes the garlic off of Vlad's neck. Eddie is spared when Henry shows up and convinces Vlad to wait until not as many people can see them fighting. Vikas tells Vlad a story about how his best friend betrayed him. Vlad finds out that Dorian knows everyone's secrets that he encounters, but he never shares them.

On October 31, Vlad and Henry go to the Crypt for a vampire Halloween party. Henry dresses up but Vlad does not, since he only plans on feeding from Snow. Vikas is poisoned by someone so Vlad doesn't have lessons that day. Vlad wrongly exacts revenge on Joss without killing him; he breaks Joss' arm and beats him up. Vlad also finds out that they have been invited to Thanksgiving dinner at the McMillan's. Vlad is nearly killed by D'Ablo but Vlad breaks the sacrificial blade that D'Ablo tried to kill him with, off in D'Ablo's body. Afterwards, Vlad goes to the winter dance with Snow. Vlad and Otis go to New York for Otis's pre-trial. The pre-trial and the trial are held in the secret room of The V-Bar.

On December 31, Tristian is killed by someone who wants to get at the Vampires of Bathory. Eddie Poe ends up writing an article about Vlad being a vampire. After this, Vlad skips school for several days with the intent of never going to school again. During Vlad's last lesson by Vikas, he moves as Vikas and Otis have never seen any vampire move before. Dorian allows Vlad to ask several questions about the prophecy. He finds out that he will rule over Vampire kind out of necessity and he will enslave the Human race out of charity.

Vlad and Otis go back to New York to have Otis's trial but it ends up that he is acquitted. Vlad is then put on trial for destroying D'Ablo's hand and for revealing his true nature to humans, without having a pre-trial. Joss shows up outside of Freedom Fest and kills Dorian by accident. Vlad starts to fight him off almost killing him with one last hit, but then somebody shows up at the fight and tells him to stop. The last word of the book is "Dad?".

== Twelfth Grade Kills ==
At the prologue of the book, D'Ablo is murdered by a mysterious man. He is described as familiar, but lacked further information because D'Ablo dies immediately afterward. But whatsoever, there is a very high probability of it being Vikas since Vlad saw his dad and Otis said he didn't do it. Being one of the leaders, D'Ablo must have met Vikas before and they must have been very familiar to each other.

Cutting back to the present, Vlad sees his father and doubts whether he really is there. He thinks he is going crazy from having drunk Dorian's blood in the previous book. His dad then disappears, leaving Vlad with Dorian's corpse and a severely injured Joss lying on the ground. Henry later comes and is the one who calls the hospital for Joss. Vlad insists that he stays despite Henry's protests. Vlad and Henry then walk home to Nelly's while Vlad explains what happened during the night. When they reach Nelly's house, they are greeted by Em and Enrico. Em informs Vlad and his Uncle Otis that D'Ablo is dead. Vlad then negotiates with Em to let him go free if he gives her his father, who Vlad is still uncertain is alive. Em agrees and gives Vlad until the end of the year to hand over his father. She then tells Vlad that she is actually his great-grandmother. Vlad is immensely surprised, especially when Otis reassures him by saying it's true.

After Em's visit, Vlad and Henry go to the hospital to visit Joss. Two cops confront Vlad about Joss, and Vlad answers some of their questions. Joss's mother will not let Vlad anywhere near Joss. After the visit, two more cops confront Vlad outside the hospital. The four cops attack Vlad, revealing that they are Slayers. Vlad knocks them unconscious with his vampire abilities.

Later that day, Vlad begins his search for his father all over town. Soon enough Henry, Otis, and Vikas help him in the search. Finally, days later, Vlad decides to go to his hiding spot (the belfry) in the school. When he is there, he discovers his father, who greets him warmly and explains his motives for hiding. Vlad and his father finally make up go to their house as father and son. At the house Tomas says he was hiding from a secret vampire society that wants the Pravus to enslave vampire kind to make vampires the world's supreme rulers and that they were responsible for the fire and Mellina's death. Otis shows up soon after and gets angry at his half brother for making Vlad suffer for many years.

At the end, Snow is turned into a vampire by Vlad to keep her from dying; and Tomas is revealed to be an evil man who had a child just so Vlad could become the Pravus, and he could take his son's powers. Tomas also killed Vlad's mom, and the man in the charred bed was Aidan, the son of Dorian. Nelly dies at the hand of Tomas. Later Vlad kills Tomas with Joss's stake. Vikas turned out to be Tomas' partner in crime and had helped Tomas kill Mellina, Vlad's mom. Vikas had opened the drapes to burn Aidan. Vikas is killed by the Lucis which slips from Vlad's hand- while on- and falls over the edge of a building, slicing an unsuspecting Vikas in half. Also, it is supposedly revealed that Snow's eyes turn iridescent green near the end, leaving Vlad to wonder what the future may hold.
