= Illness or Modern Women =

Play written by Elfriede Jelinek

Illness or Modern Women (German: Krankheit oder Moderne Frauen. Wie ein Stück.) is a play by the Austrian playwright Elfriede Jelinek. It was published in 1984 in the avant-garde journal manuscripte of Graz and premiered on the stage of the Schauspielhaus Bonn on February 12, 1987, directed by Hans Hollmann. The play was published in book form by Prometh Verlag in 1987 with an afterword by Regine Friedrich. The title "parodically conflates women with illness." The play is based on an earlier, shorter radio play by Jelinek called Erziehung eines Vampirs (Bringing Up a Vampire), which appeared in 1986 on Süddeutscher Rundfunk.

== Characters ==
- Emily, nurse and vampire
- Carmilla, housewife, mother, and vampire
- Dr. Heidkliff, dentist, gynecologist, and Emily's fiancé
- Dr. Benno Hundekoffer, tax consultant and Carmilla's husband
- A saint
- A female martyr

Also

- Five people (of various sizes) on roller skates
- A talking baby doll with a pretty voice on cassette
- Two well-trained hunting dogs
- A pair of ladies in beautiful clothes
- "One giant Siamese twin doll", consisting of Emily and Carmilla sewn together

== Plot ==
Emily, the play's protagonist and a nurse, decides to leave her fiancé, Dr. Heidkliff, after falling in love with another woman, Carmilla. Unbeknownst to her fiancé, Emily meets Carmilla, who is pregnant, through her gynecological practice. Carmilla is married to Dr. Benno Hundekoffer. During childbirth, Carmilla dies, but is turned into a vampire by Emily. When Dr. Heidkliff discovers Emily's transformation and decision to leave him for Carmilla, he and Benno decide to track down both women in order to kill them for "mock[ing] creation".

== Critical response ==
Dr. Leanne Dawson notes that the play contains references to Kleist's Penthesilea (1808) and the Dichter-Vampir (Vampire poet) found in Goethe's Die Braut von Corinth (1797), which "provide an unusual intertextuality between the femme vampire and the German literary canon, which blends high and low culture." Sexual connotations abound within the play too, especially in reference to Dr. Heidkliff's planned killing of the two women. On how he plans to kill the women, Heidkliff says, "Plane the head down, fill up the mouth and cunt with garlic." Dawson writes that the men "focus on stuffing the female cavities and the male need to penetrate these cavities with garlic, as entry is forbidden to their penis." Other scholars suggest that Jelinek "contrasts Emily and Carmilla's vampirism—a condition that leaves them neither dead nor alive—with the exaggerated vitality of Carmilla's husband, Dr. Bruno Hundekoffer."

Gitta Honegger, an academic and translator of Jelinek's work, states, "The undead have haunted Jelinek's plays ever since a woman dying in childbirth returned as a vampire in her 1987 play Illness or Modern Women." Jelinek's later plays and novels, particularly Children of the Dead and the Princess Plays, contain depictions, actual and metaphorical, of the undead, which critics take to be representative of Austria's National Socialist history and Jelinek's family losses during the Holocaust. Jelinek writes that Austria has "not been able, like other countries, to identify with the great, important figures of its past, its culture, or its history, and is stuck in the alternative of lightness or mountains of corpses."

Krankheit originates some of the tactics with which Jelinek examines and subjugates clichés in her later work. Vera Boiter assesses the play by how it "appropriates the usual patriarchal stereotypes, images, and ideologies by completely reversing them and hurling them back to their place of origin. The vampires, Carmilla and Emily, for example, reverse the alleged natural designation of women as childbearers. Instead of giving life, they suck the blood of the children and 'take away' life." Another example of this is her reversal of or play on linguistic puns. When Carmilla exclaims, "I am sick, therefore I am," she provides a "Cartesian affirmation of a female hysteric condition, the line is a telling example of how Jelinek seeks to inflate sexually exploitative language and female stereotypes in order to invert the representational tradition." The vampire women, modeled after the lesbian vampire subtext in Joseph Sheridan Le Fanu's Carmilla (1872), transform into lesbians, which subverts gender crossing and "normal" ideas about vampirism; by transforming into both vampires and lesbians, Jelinek's characters distort the very notion of how transformation "should" occur and what expectations are held about those transformations.
