= Night Huntress =

Series of novels by Jeaniene Frost

- Cover for Halfway to the Grave, the first book in the series
- Halfway to the Grave; One Foot in the Grave; At Grave's End; Destined for an Early Grave; This Side of the Grave; One Grave at a Time; First Drop of Crimson; Eternal Kiss of Darkness; Once Burned; Twice Tempted; Up from the Grave
- Author: Jeaniene Frost
- Country: United States
- Language: English
- Genre: Urban fantasy, Paranormal romance
- Publisher: Avon
- Published: 2007-present
- Media type: Print (Paperback)

Night Huntress is a series of seven urban fantasy romance novels by author Jeaniene Frost. The first novel was published in 2007 by Avon and took place in a world where supernatural creatures exist but are not known to the general public at large. The series initially focused on the character of half-vampire, Catherine "Cat" Crawfield and her full-vampire lover, Bones. But eventually, the book shifted focus to other characters such as Vlad Tepesh, a character that Frost had initially not planned to include.

== Synopsis ==
Catherine "Cat" Crawfield is the child of a woman who was raped by a vampire, and developed a penchant for killing vampires. Cat goes out almost every night in the hopes of finding and slaying her father, only to be captured by the vampiric bounty hunter, Bones. After some initial reluctance on Cat's part, the two of them form a partnership to find and capture her father and eventually fall in love with one another.

== Reception ==
Critical reception for Night Huntress has been predominantly positive, with Library Journal frequently praising the series. RT Book Reviews has also given frequent praise for the novels, with Eternal Kiss of Darkness winning its 2010 Vampire Romance Award. Publishers Weekly has mostly praised the series, but has stated that the "would-be witticisms [begin] to grate" in Once Burned.

== Bibliography ==
=== The Night Huntress series ===
Cat's point of view:

1. Halfway to the Grave (October 30, 2007, ISBN 0-06-124508-9)
2. One Foot in the Grave (April 29, 2008, ISBN 0-06-124509-7)
3. At Grave's End (December 30, 2008, ISBN 0-06-158307-3)
4. Destined for an Early Grave (July 28, 2009, ISBN 0-06-158321-9)
5. This Side Of The Grave (February 22, 2011, ISBN 0-06-178318-8)
6. One Grave at a Time (August 30, 2011, ISBN 0-06-178319-6)
7. Up from the Grave (January 28, 2014, ISBN 0-06-207611-6)

Bones's point of view:

1. The Other Half of the Grave (April 26, 2022, ISBN 978-1-64197-198-0)
2. Both Feet in the Grave (April 18, 2023, ISBN 979-8-37686-059-5)

=== The Night Huntress World series ===
1. First Drop of Crimson (February 9, 2010, ISBN 0-06-158322-7)
2. Eternal Kiss of Darkness (July 27, 2010, ISBN 0-06-178316-1)

=== The Night Prince series ===
1. Once Burned (June 26, 2012, ISBN 0-06-178320-X)
2. Twice Tempted (March 26, 2013, ISBN 0-06-207610-8)
3. Bound by Flames (January 27, 2015, ISBN 0-06-207608-6)
4. Into the Fire (October 25, 2016)

=== The Night Rebel series ===
1. Shades of Wicked (October 30, 2018)
2. Wicked Bite (January 28, 2020)
3. Wicked All Night (February 23, 2021)

=== Short Stories and Novellas ===
- Happily Never After (May 27, 2008, ISBN 0-06-147268-9)
- Devil to Pay (June 30, 2009, ISBN 0-06-178736-1)
- Reckoning (August 25, 2009, ISBN 0-06-169993-4)
- One for the Money (August 3, 2010, ISBN 0-441-01868-8)
- Home for the Holidays (October 25, 2011, ISBN 978-0-06232-204-3)
- Outtakes from the Grave (December 8, 2015, ISBN 978-1-51976-242-9)
- A Grave Girls' Getaway (December 13, 2021, ISBN 979-8-78418-083-4)

== Main characters ==
=== Night Huntress ===
- Catherine "Cat" Kathleen Crawfield: A half-human, half vampire, the product of rape. She starts with an inherent prejudice towards all vampires because of her father's treatment to her mother, but she falls in love with a master vampire named Bones, and slowly begins to overcome her deep seated prejudices and anger. She later decides to be changed into a vampire, but due to her half-breed nature drinks vampire and ghoul blood instead of human blood.
- Bones: A British vampire made in the 18th century who works as an undead bounty hunter and later head of a vampire line, turned into a vampire close to his 24th birthday. Becomes Cat's partner, combat trainer, boyfriend, and eventually husband.
- Justina Crawfield: Originally a human but later changed into a vampire.
- Don: Cat's boss and uncle. Later becomes a sentient ghost.
- Tate: Cat's human friend who becomes her second in command when working for the government.
- Juan: Cat's human friend and lieutenant when working for the government, later turned into a vampire by Bones. A former convict, and well known for being a joker and promiscuous womanizer.
- Dave: Cat's friend and lieutenant, turned into a ghoul.

=== Night Huntress World Series ===
- Denise MacGregor: Cat's human best friend who is later branded by a demon and gains shapeshifting abilities.
- Spade: A master vampire, Denise's husband and Bones's best friend.
- Kira Graceling: A human private investigator and main character of Eternal Kiss of Darkness.
- Mencheres: An ancient master vampire turned around 2500-2600 BC and formerly Menkaure a former Pharaoh of the 4th Egyptian Dynasty.

=== Night Prince series ===
- Vlad Tepesh: Born in the 15th century and turned into a vampire in his early thirties.
- Leila Dalton: A human who is 25, she can tell the future and past of a person and can find someone in the present.
- Marty: A vampire turned in the early 1900s. He accidentally killed his only daughter Vera shortly after being turned into a vampire.
- Gretchen Dalton: Leila's younger sister.
- Hugh Dalton: A human and Leila and Gretchen's father.
- Maximus: A vampire who works for Vlad.
