= The Last Vampire =

Book series by Christopher Pike

The Last Vampire series (later rebranded as Thirst) consists of books written by Christopher Pike and chronicles the life of Sita, a 5,000-year-old vampire.

== Publication history ==
The Last Vampire was published in 1994. Sequels were originally published as numbered "The Last Vampire" titles. The Last Vampire 2: Black Blood was published later in 1994, and The Last Vampire 3: Red Dice followed in 1995. 1996 saw the publication of three additional titles over a span of six months: The Last Vampire 4: Phantom, The Last Vampire 5: Evil Thirst, and The Last Vampire 6: Creatures of Forever. In 2009, the first three novels were republished in a new omnibus edition entitled Thirst No. 1: Human Urges, Fatal Consequences. The series' new branding drops "The Last Vampire" from all titles beyond the first, listing the individual titles as "The Last Vampire," "Black Blood," and "Red Dice." In 2010, the next three novels were similarly republished as a single volume, Thirst No. 2: Deepest Desire, Instant Remorse, identified as consisting of "Phantom," "Evil Thirst," and "Creatures of Forever." When Pike wrote further novels in the series, they continued under the "Thirst" name and numbering: Thirst No. 3: The Eternal Dawn (2010), Thirst No. 4: The Shadow of Death (2011), and Thirst No. 5: The Sacred Veil (2013). On his Facebook page, Pike has shared different versions of the beginning of his next planned entry in the series, Thirst No. 6: Sita, which he intends to self-publish upon its completion. After stating in 2016 that the story would extend into a seventh and eighth book, Pike announced in 2020 that Sita's story will end with Thirst No. 7, also to be self-published.

== Books ==
- Thirst No. 1: Human Urges, Fatal Consequences
  - The Last Vampire (1994)
  - The Last Vampire 2: Black Blood (1994)
  - The Last Vampire 3: Red Dice (1995)
- Thirst No. 2: Deepest Desire, Instant Remorse
  - The Last Vampire 4: Phantom (1996)
  - The Last Vampire 5: Evil Thirst (1996)
  - The Last Vampire 6: Creatures of Forever (1996)
- Thirst No. 3: The Eternal Dawn (2010)
- Thirst No. 4: The Shadow of Death (2011)
- Thirst No. 5: The Sacred Veil (2013)

== Film adaptation ==
According to the Simon & Schuster author page, the Thirst (The Last Vampire) series is slated to be released as a feature film. As of September 2010, FilmNation has acquired the screen rights to The Last Vampire series.

As of April 2013, according to Pike's official Facebook page, the author has retrieved the movie rights from FilmNation and hopes to find a production company that will remain closer to his original vision of his main characters. On September 20, 2013, Christopher Pike released a statement via his fan page on Facebook. He says, Michael Preger (Preger Entertainment LLC) is very interested in "The Last Vampire" and is keen to "keep the story and the character of Sita intact." Pike says "Since completing the deal with Michael, we’ve talked at length about the film and I’m even more confident than ever that he’ll do the books justice." The deal is reported to be valued in the mid to high six figures.
