= Vampire Beach =

Novel series by Alex Duval

Vampire Beach is a series of teen vampire novels written by Alex Duval a pseudonym for the authors Melinda Metz and Linda J. Burns, published by Simon & Schuster. The series follows Jason, a human whose family moves out to Malibu. Jason learns that the hottest clique in Malibu are actually all vampires. The series was originally published in 2006, and was re-published in 2010 with updated cover art. It differs from many teen vampire series as it is told from Jason's point of view.

== Plot ==
=== Bloodlust ===
Senior Jason Freeman thinks that life will start when he moves to Malibu. In his school he meets an incredibly gorgeous girl named Sienna. There's only a few problems. #1: She's taken. #2: She's a vampire. Meanwhile, there is a vampire killing people in Malibu. Jason decides to help hunt him down. In an intense battle in an alley, the vampire is killed.

=== Initiation ===
Jason Freeman is getting the hang of DeVere Heights. Then life from his flyover past pays an unexpected visit in the form of his old friend Tyler. Jason's surprised—by psyched to see a familiar face. Having his friend around turns out to be a downer—especially when Jason realizes that Tyler is running from some kind of crisis. But Tyler isn't in on the DeVere Heights's little secret. Now instead of escaping his problem, he's about to put himself in mortal danger. Literally.

=== Ritual ===
After retrieving the relic, Jason is flagged as a vampire by a vampire hunter. He shoots Jason with a crossbow. The wound is not fatal, but Jason does not remember the accident clearly. While visiting Jason in the hospital, Sienna has a fight with her vampire boyfriend, Brad and they decide to break up. But Brad blames Jason for losing Sienna and gives him a hard time until he realises that he and Sienna have been drifting apart, which has caused Sienna to break up with him. The chief of police decides to get the best detectives on the case as a dead body is found. The hunter continues hunting and kills several vampires. The detectives agree to allow Sienna's charity ball to go on as planned when one of the detectives asks her to go down to the station. Jason realises the detective is the vampire hunter and Sienna is in danger. He chases them down until they crash. He pulls Sienna from the wreckage but the detective dies. As they walk away, They are intercepted by Sienna's ex, who explains to Jason that he is okay with Jason and Sienna dating and is sorry for giving him a hard time.

=== Legacy ===
Jason is with his dream girl and things are great. Until Sienna's parents decide to separate them that is. In a steamy meeting in the rain Jason's aunt catches them and threatens to report them to Sienna's parents, unless he is turned into a vampire. The downside is that the transformation can cause insanity and death in some people. Thankfully, the lab that Sienna's dad works at has a machine that can tell Jason if the transformation is right for him. It is, but it's not alright for his aunt, who is a powerful figure in vampire politics. She disappears, and Sienna's parents agree to let them see each other again.

=== High Stakes ===
Sienna's big sister, Paige, returns to Malibu and convinces Jason and his friends to take a spontaneous trip to Las Vegas. It becomes clear that Paige has a frightening secret (which considering they are mostly vampires is saying something) which could put them all in danger. The stakes get high as they battle to save one of their own.

=== Hunted ===
As the senior year draws to a close tensions are heightened by the unexplained disappearance of vampires in other cities. When the parents all leave for a major vampire conference, the disappearances start in Malibu. Jason and his friends have to track down who is kidnapping vampires and why - and this time, the humans may have to save the day.

== Background ==
Vampire Beach is among the many young adult series about vampires that have surged in popularity by the early 2010s. According to Voice of Youth Advocates's Lorraie Squires, the book is influenced by the television series Beverly Hills, 90210 and the horror fiction novelist R. L. Stine. She said that traditionalists would be upset by how the series reimagines vampire lore but could resonate with The O.C. and A-List audiences.

== Reception ==
In her review of Initiation, Ellie Housden of The Courier-Mail wrote that the book "isn't as wholesome as some teenage fiction; there's some drinking and suggestions of lust that have nothing to do with blood." The Age book critic Frances Atkinson found the book to be "unashamedly cheesy", filled with "teen-speak and popular culture references", and "the book you can't wait to read on the beach". A reviewer from The Bookseller praised the book, stating, "I can't help loving these books, they are out-rageously addictive, super cool, and as sharp as a wooden stake right to the heart."

John Jacob of The ALAN Review called Bloodlust "a well-written tale of school life in Malibu". South Wales Argus book critic Paul McGarvey thought the book lacked originality but concluded it was "an enjoyable enough and breezy read for fans of trashy teen fiction".
