= List of Young Dracula characters =

This article lists the characters and related details for the CBBC children's television series Young Dracula.

== Main cast ==
Character	Actor	Description
Count Dracula	Keith-Lee Castle	Count Dracula is a 600-year-old vampire who has emigrated to England from Transylvania with his two children, Ingrid and Vlad, to escape a torch-wielding "angry peasant mob". Although one of the world's most powerful vampires, he has nevertheless decided to keep a low profile. Despite his claims to be the "Prince of Darkness", the Count displays occasional compassion; he is deeply in love with Magda Westenra, Ingrid's estranged mother, and has a soft spot for "breather" women. The Count also adheres to traditionally vampiric values, such as favoring Vlad while ignoring Ingrid's obvious vampiric talents; despite repeatedly shunning Ingrid for being female, he eventually confesses his fatherly love for her when near death.
Vladimir "Vlad" Dracula	Gerran Howell	Vlad is the Count's "son and heir". Unlike his sister Ingrid, Vlad would much prefer to be a normal boy than a vampire, but still wants to please the Count; much of the series focuses on the conflict of these two ideals. He initially finds friends in the Branaghs and often talks to his loyal, talking stuffed wolf, Zoltan. Vlad eventually discovers that he is to be the "Chosen One", the leader of all vampires, who will guide the vampire race to a new destiny. After escaping from Stokely when Ingrid takes over, the Count continues to prepare Vlad to embrace his vampiric destiny which he eventually does. However, he still believes in vampires and breathers co-existing together and does all he can to make this happen. Vlad for a long time only drank soya blood substitute and avoided drinking human blood, something he promised himself never to do. It was only in the fourth season when his girlfriend Erin was on her deathbed and against her wishes, out of love he bit her and turned her into a vampire. After facing her anger and also because of an unsuccessful battle with Malik, Vlad became so downhearted that he did what he had sworn never to do; drink human blood, one of the bottles of blood kept in the Draculas' blood cellar, but he soon reverted to his original way and only drank soya substitute. Vlad still carries out his responsibilities of protecting his loved ones and saved his family from becoming slain by Sethius in the third season, and with Ingrid's help, by Malik and his mother in the fourth season. In season five Vlad discovers that he is in fact "half-breather" when the Count reluctantly admits he had a fling with a breather woman who named him Adam; the Count made sure to adopt him to ensure he would fit into the vampire world. As he approaches his eighteenth birthday, and the time of becoming the Chosen One approaches, Vlad has begun to lose his powers as his human side emerges. As he is half human, he is ultimately given the choice to remain a vampire or become a breather on his 18th birthday; initially choosing the latter, he eventually decides to stay a vampire to pursue his relationship with Talitha and travel the world.
Ingrid Dracula	Clare Thomas	Ingrid is the eldest child of Count Dracula. Unlike her brother Vlad, she embraces the vampiric lifestyle and dresses in feminine, black or red Gothic clothes. Ingrid is an attractive but cruel character, spending most of her time taunting people or arguing with her father, whom she wishes to impress, but to no avail. Initially furious at having to move to England, she enjoys the popularity at her new school. Her ultimate goal is to become an "all-powerful vampire goddess". When the Count became trapped and Vlad was injured, she took the opportunity to seize the Dracula throne to avenge the death of her boyfriend, Will; the Count and Vlad were then forced to flee. After rejoining the family at Garside four years later, she has attempted to increase her power with many schemes, often involving the Vampire High Council. Despite her actions, she is not entirely heartless, having shown compassion from time to time, like after receiving a bracelet as a gift from Mrs. Branagh. She also, despite having made several attempts to "dust" Vlad in the past, seemed to become genuinely upset when he had ingested poison in an attempt to save the Count. Ingrid's attitude towards her family constantly shifts; if shown affection from her family, quite often she will remain loyal and helpful to them. If hurt or offended, she will plot against them.
Renfield	Simon Ludders	Percival Renfield is the Draculas' servant and dogsbody, a dimwitted, unclean "breather" who has been in service to the Draculas for his entire life after the death of his servant father, Renfield Sr. He does all that he can to help the Count, but tends to get things wrong. Despite appearing to be unintelligent, he is seen to be skilled at alchemy and dentistry, with working knowledge of similar areas of science. He also appears to have a penchant for cross-dressing. He wants nothing more than to become a vampire himself, and eventually gets his wish when the Count sees no other way out to one of Ingrid's schemes. Despite this, his personality seemingly remains much the same as before.

== Extended family ==
Character	Actor	Description
Magda Carmilla Elizabetha Bathoria Westenra	Donna Grant	Magda is the Count's ex-wife who "ran off with a werewolf" named Patrick, much to the Count's disgust. She is considerably vain and selfish, often manipulating the Count's feelings towards her, and claiming to love him, when she has ulterior motives. The Count seems to love her precisely because she is so heartless. Later, Magda has a part-werewolf son with Patrick, though once again she manipulates the Count by trying to pretend that he is the father. She leaves to return to Patrick after her ruse is discovered. Magda is the mother of Ingrid and supposedly Vlad, but the Count later reveals Vlad's biological mother is in fact a breather; Madga had agreed to accept Vlad as her son to ease the pressure of producing a male heir.
Barry "Wolfie" Westenra	Lorenzo Rodriguez	Wolfie is Magda and Patrick's part-werewolf son and Ingrid's half-brother. She attempts to manipulate the Count by pretending that Wolfie is his, but leaves after her ruse is discovered. When she appears at Garside Grange and ultimately fails to become Vlad's regent, she leaves her dog behind, which is revealed to be Wolfie. He remains at Garside with the Count on a "trial basis" after the Count discovers that he may hold some affection for Wolfie. Wolfie gains acceptance with the Count and develops a good relationship with Renfield, helping him with many of his alchemy endeavors. After Magda takes Wolfie back in series 5, Renfield is deeply grieved.
Krone and Atilla Westenra	Howell Evans and Rosamund Shelly	Krone and Atilla are Ingrid's grandparents, described as being "wicked, spiteful and evil". They are incredibly strict about vampire laws, believing that the traditional vampiric ways should be upheld at all times. Neither Krone nor Atilla think much of the Count, and claim he brought further shame upon the family when he moved them to Stokely. They show favouritism towards Ingrid, but in accordance with vampire tradition share the view with the rest of the family that Vlad should be the one to inherit the title, despite his lack of natural aptitude.
Ivan Dracula	Phillip Brodie	Ivan is the Count's younger brother who lives in America, but who briefly stays at the Castle with his two children, Boris and Olga. Despite being introduced in a flashback as evil and bloodthirsty, Ivan took up a blood-free way of life, drinking "soya blood" and making his living from real estate. After smelling slayer's blood, he returns to his bloodthirsty ways, much to Vlad's dismay, before moving back to America with Boris and Olga.
Boris Dracula	Ciaran Joyce	Boris is Ingrid and Vlad's cousin who, like Vlad, does not wish to be a vampire. A physically weak asthmatic, he develops a friendship with Vlad, and both attempt to find a way out of transformation before Boris' upcoming sixteenth birthday. Unable to find a way out of transformation, Boris becomes a handsome vampire who manipulates Vlad into believing he has transformed into a "good" vampire, but he soon reveals his true nature as a hysterical, power-hungry maniac. After Ivan moves his family back to America, Boris returns by disguising himself as the vampire community's "judge, jury and executioner", slaying the Grand High Vampire and attempting to take the Grand High Vampire's crown, but as only one who is worth of wearing the crown may do so, he is instantly turned to dust.
Olga Dracula	Maddie Rakic-Platt	Olga is Ivan's daughter and Boris's sister. She acts like a sweet girl in front of Ivan and the Count, but is fiercely and competitively evil when not in the company of adults. She often engaged in verbal warfare with Ingrid, and as well as always being very confident, tends to win.
Will Clarke	Harry Ferrier	Will is Ingrid's boyfriend at Stokely who attends Stokely Grammar and appears to be one of the most popular boys there; he proves himself to be different from the other boys there as he does not fawn over Ingrid. At first, Ingrid views him as an annoyance, but quickly finds herself in love with him, despite initial disgust at the idea of dating a breather. Ingrid later bites him to avoid her vampiric identity being discovered, causing him to become a "half-fang", a vampire that was not born, but bitten as a mortal. Will seems to enjoy his life as a vampire living in the Dracula castle, providing Ingrid with the attention and love she had needed, but his new reckless attitude costs him his life when slayers attack the castle. His death drives Ingrid's rage, and she seizes the opportunity to claims the Count's throne for her own, intending to avenge Will's death.

== The Branaghs ==
Character	Actor	Description
Graham and Elizabeth Branagh	Aneirin Hughes and Beth Robert	Graham and Elizabeth are the cheery, typically suburbanite neighbours of the Draculas and a constant annoyance to the Count Dracula. Where the Count does his best to make Vlad a "normal vampire", they constantly do their best to make Robin a "normal boy", finding his fixation with vampires somewhat unhealthy. Though they eventually discover the true nature of the Dracula family, Vlad erases their memories of vampires, and the family leave the castle to return to normal life.
Robin Branagh	Craig Roberts	Robin is Vlad's best friend and self-confessed "vampire geek", even to the extent of wearing a black cape to school and owning a sort of contraption that enables him to hang upside down. Robin is the first person outside of the Dracula household to discover that Vlad is in fact a vampire after spotting a hearse from his bedroom and following it up to the castle then climbing inside Vlad's bedroom window. Despite being considered strange, Robin is shown to be a respectable artist and an excellent chess player, as well as a brilliant football player, much to his shock. Robin's love of vampire culture is frequently used as a counter to Vlad's desire to be a normal human, often not caring for the "danger" or "significance" of a given situation but preferring the "coolness" of vampirism. Though a loyal friend to Vlad, he often tries to encourage Vlad's vampiric destiny, at times only begrudgingly helping Vlad in his attempts to avoid becoming a vampire; Robin fears that if Vlad does achieve his wish in becoming normal he will no longer speak to Robin leaving him feeling alone once again. Along with the rest of his family, Vlad mind-wipes Robin making him forget that vampires ever existed. However, it is revealed in the later series that Vlad can not mind-wipe someone he cares about, so although it is not made clear in series three, it could be possible that Robin never forgot about his Vlad. In series four, Vlad tells Erin about Robin and confesses that even four years after the mind-wipe he still misses him.
Chloe Branagh	Lucy Borja-Edwards	Chloe is Robin's younger sister and the only person besides Robin who knows the true nature of the Draculas. At first frightened and threatening to report him to the school headteacher, she soon realizes Vlad is good and becomes friends with him and like Robin promises to keep the fact his family are vampires secret. Chloe is the voice of reason in the friendship between Vlad, Robin and herself, and is often seen as the rival of Ingrid. She describes herself as a "child prodigy", and has a depth of knowledge ranging from Egyptian hieroglyphs to psychology. A caring person, she attempts to help Renfield stand up for his rights against the Count, with limited success. She later shies away from her friendship with Vlad after the incident at the castle that nearly saw her family attacked by vampires, but does help Vlad and Robin look for an artifact that would cure the curse of vampirism.
Ian and Paul Branagh	Ben McGregor and Luke Bridgeman	Ian and Paul are the not overly bright twin sons of Graham and Elizabeth. Both have huge crushes on Ingrid, and alternately rival and assist one another in getting near her. Though originally annoyed by their presence, Ingrid eventually learns to manipulate them to her advantage. They do not seem to have a good brotherly relationship with Robin, whom they frequently refer to as the "freak" or the "weirdo goth child", but they were impressed and surprised by Robin's talent at football and gave him a place on the school team. That is until Robin purposely played badly so he could make amends with Vlad after an argument over the Blood Test.

== The Van Helsings ==
Character	Actor	Description
Eric Van Helsing	Terence Maynard	A vampire slayer who originally believed Robin to be a vampire due to his appearance, but turned his attention to Vlad after discovering he lived in a castle and had arrived from Transylvania. His daytime, or "cover", identity is as a woodwork teacher at Stokely Grammar School, which Vlad, Ingrid, Robin and Chloe attend. Whilst not a real threat to the much stronger, smarter Count, he is a constant annoyance to the family, who under no circumstances can afford to have their secret revealed to the world. His obsession annoys Jonathan who initially does not believe in vampires and would rather live a normal life. Despite entering the castle multiple times in many disguises, he has only once come close to slaying the Count, when he fired a wooden crossbow-bolt at the Count's heart, deflected by a flask of blood in the Count's waistcoat pocket. He finally manages to slay a vampire when rescuing Mina from the clutches of the Count, but as Vlad erases the memory of the mortals in the castle, he soon after forgets the existence of vampires along with the Branaghs. In series three, it is revealed that Eric has died at the hands of a vampire because of the increased susceptibility the mind-wipe caused.
Jonathan "Jonno" Van Helsing	Terry Haywood	Jonathan is the son of Eric and reluctant heir to the traditional vampire-slaying vocation of the Van Helsings. Throughout series one, Jonathan is often exasperated by Eric's tendency to see vampires everywhere. A running joke is Jonathan expressing concern that Eric will go to prison and trying to persuade Eric to use less violent techniques to find evidence of vampirism. Despite plenty of opportunities, Jonathan fails to recognize that Vlad, Ingrid and the Count are vampires until the final episode of the first series, mainly because Vlad acts so normal and Eric has never found a real vampire before while with Jonathan. Eric continuously ignores his needs because of his obsession with vampire-slaying. Jonathan occasionally tries to tell Eric that his obsession is the reason Mina left him for an estate agent, but after discovering that the Draculas are vampires, he develops a hatred for Vlad and all the members of the Draculas, and decides to follow in Eric's footsteps. Along with the Branaghs, his memory is erased by Vlad at the end of the second series. Jonathan's voice is heard when the two slayers contact SHQ in the first episode of series three, and makes his reappearance in series three, episode 10. He and Mina arrive at Garside Grange to survey the conditions the Draculas are living in, seemingly mind-wiped, so they can exact their revenge upon the clan.
Mina Van Helsing	Jo-Anne Knowles	Mina is the wife of Eric, who left him and Jonathan before series one began, having become sick of Eric's obsession with vampires. She returns in series two to discover that Jonathan now shares Eric's obsession with vampires and decides to temporarily remain with Eric and Jonathan, in the hope of knocking some sense into them. After the Count is taunted by Ingrid for not biting any "breathers", the Count captures Mina and keeps her in the castle dungeons. She is saved by Eric and Jonathan, and apologizes for not believing them, but thanks to Vlad, forgets about vampires and that she was ever a prisoner. She returns in series three with Jonathan to jointly avenge Eric's death.

== Ramanga Clan ==
Character	Actor	Description
Ramanga	Robbie Gee	Head of the vampire clans and member of the Vampire High Council, Ramanga is a powerful vampire with the ability to split himself into many copies. He arrives at Garside Grange after being called by the Praedictum Impaver. He and the Count force Vlad into an arranged marriage with Ramanga's daughter Adze, but it is eventually revealed that he was plotting to dust Vlad after Adze received power from Vlad's bite in the bloodbinding ceremony. After the Count and Malik track Ramanga down, he splits himself into thousands of copies and prepares to fight, but the Count overpowers Ramanga and de-fangs him. With the loss of his fangs, Ramanga entered a state of depression and exiled himself to the Karakum Desert to die by sunlight, but it is later revealed that Ramanga didn't die and used necromancy to pass into the Shadow Realm and learn the knowledge of the ancient vampires. He returns from the Shadow Realm and attempts to remove Vlad's power and take it for himself, but he is swiftly dusted by the Count in retaliation.
Adze Ramanga	Natasha Stokes	Adze arrives when summoned by Count Dracula and Ramanga she was made to be Vlad's wife and to be his first ever bite but little did the Draculas know that Ramanga and Adze were plotting against them. Ramanga and Adze attempted to frame Ryan and kill Erin more than once. In the end they got hold of the ring of Arianrod which in they kill Vlad. Adze blew a fire ball causing Erin to fall off the roof of Gardside Grange. Adze was eventually dusted by Mina.
Asan Ramanga	Quinton Nyirenda	Asan is a young vampire of about ten years old. He is first seen appealing to the Count for help when he claims the Shadow Warriors attacked his village. However, this proves to be untrue as it is revealed that Asan is Ramanga's youngest son and has come to the Draculas to avenge him for humiliating him and eventually for believing he has been dusted. Despite this he becomes close to George and Malik, and tries to persuade Ramanga to spare Malik when Ramanga plans to use him in a ritual to absorb Vlad's dormant chosen one powers. The ritual fails as Malik is dusted and the Count kills Ramanga. After this Asan leaves with his brother Shango to get revenge. Throughout the series Asan's loyalties are divided most of the time. He wants to avenge his father, but at the same time feels guilty for betraying any kindness shown to him by either the Draculas or Sally and George. At the end of the series, Asan and Shango make peace with Vlad when the Blood Seed is safely contained.
Shango Ramanga	Amron Adams	The eldest son of Ramanga and Asan's brother. He wishes to have revenge on the Draculas when he believed Ramanga had been dusted. When the Count was planning to sell Garside, Shango pretended he was interested in purchasing it, whilst keeping his identity and his motives secret. When Ramanga really was dusted by the Count, Shango once again swore revenge. At the end of the series, he somewhat reluctantly agreed to make peace with Vlad after the chaos with the Blood Seed.

== At Garside Grange ==
Character	Actor	Description
Erin Noble	Sydney Rae White	Erin arrives in the Dracula household having saved a sick Ingrid from the threatening slayers, claiming that she has been bitten and is a half-fang, but at the end of the first episode of the third series, it is shown that Erin has a reflection, revealing she lied about being a vampire. In the second episode of Series 3, she is revealed as a slayer who wishes to kill Ingrid and the Draculas to save her brother, Ryan. Ingrid bit Ryan and Erin believes Ingrid's death would make him human again, but despite numerous opportunities, she cannot stake her as she cannot morally distinguish Ingrid as not human. In the episode "Fangs for the Memories", Vlad tells Erin that this is just an old legend which doesn't work despite people trying. In this episode it is also implied that Vlad may have feelings for her as he once had a dream about kissing her, and in "Carpathian Feast", Vlad confesses feelings to Erin, and he kisses her. He discovers the secret that she is a breather and decides to keep it. After this Erin and Vlad become closer. Vlad and Erin's romantic interests towards each other grow into the series, even proclaiming their love for each other, but when Erin is dying and against her wishes, Vlad bites her to save her. After this Erin says she will never forgive him, but Erin soon embraces the vampiric lifestyle if not to spite Vlad. When Elizabeta's plot to kill the Draculas fails, Malik and Erin, who had assisted him are banished by Vlad. When Malik returned in season 5, he revealed that Erin was dusted by a shadow warrior sent by Ramanga. White revealed via Twitter that Erin's last name is "Noble".
Ryan Noble	Tom Gibbons	Ryan is Erin's brother. Ingrid bites Ryan, turning him into a "half-fang", but his slayer blood causes her to become violently ill. Erin believes Ryan can be saved from his vampiric fate by wiping out the vampire who bit him. Ryan is introduced in the second episode of series three: having been hiding in Erin's boot until this point, he leaves Erin's company before his full transformation begins so she can find a solution to his fate without having to fear him losing control and biting her. He reappears in the ninth episode to check on Erin's progress, and again in the tenth, where it is revealed that he gave Mina and Jonathan information on the location of the Draculas just before he was slain. Ryan's attitude to Erin becomes hostile, until she gives him a necklace before he takes part in a quiz.
Bertrand du Fortunesa	Cesare Taurasi	Bertrand suddenly appears in the school in the second episode of the third series. He is the guardian of the Praedictum Impaver, the ancient, skeletal book that is said to contain the future of the vampire race and which only the "Chosen One" can open. Bertrand's mission is to tutor Vlad to harness his powers to open the book, before he and his family get hurt. Bertrand discovers Vlad's wishes of Vampire-Breather peace, and wants to put an end to them before realizing that Vlad's way is right. In the fourth series, Bertrand has joined Vlad's gang, working for peace. After discovering that a shape-shifter is on the loose to kill Vlad, Bertrand attempts to warn Vlad but he ignores him due to his other problems such as Erin and the coexistence. When Bertrand finds the proof he needs, he is framed as a traitor and Vlad kills him before he can reveal who the shape-shifter is. After discovering Bertrand was telling the truth Vlad kills Elizabeta after also discovering she attempted to kill the Count. Vlad strongly regrets killing Bertrand and would do anything to have him back. Bertrand is over 400 years old.
Malik Vaccaria	Richard Southgate	Malik is a 300-year-old street-wise vampire who appears at Garside Grange, claiming that the Count was his father, showing the Count a locket that belonged to his mother, Elizabeta. Malik was later revealed to be plotting with his mother Elizabeta to destroy the Draculas as revenge; Vlad vanquished Elizabeta and banished Malik, along with Erin. Despite this, Malik later returned, warning the family of "Shadow Warriors" that had come to destroy them. He soon learns that the Count is not in fact his father, and that Elizabeta had lied to him. Malik was used in a ritual to transfer Vlad's powers to Ramanga, causing him to be dusted.
Elizabeta Vaccaria	Kaye Wragg	Elizabeta is Malik's mother and also ex-wife to the Count. After the Count decided his true love was Magda, and a messy divorce, she plotted revenge for hundreds of years before appearing at Garside as a shapeshifter, plotting with Malik to overthrow the family. Despite her power, Vlad was able to use his rare ability to "Zone" – turn any living being into crystal – locking Elizabeta inside and throwing her into a lake found in the family's Blood Mirror.
Alexandra McCauley	Letty Butler	Miss McCauley is the Head Teacher of Garside Grange, which the Draculas own and live in. She is smart, sassy and caring and takes an interest in the welfare of both Vlad and Ingrid. Miss McCauley is oblivious to the fact that they are all vampires, but does think the Count is rather "eccentric and peculiar". The Count is in love with Miss McCauley, and she consequently cannot be hypnotised by him. His feelings for her are made more obvious is episode 4, "Fangs for the Memories", particularly when Miss McCauley comments on the Count's "good heart" and he replies by remarking upon her heartbeat: "Sixty-five strong, healthy beats per minute...sixty-eight".
Sally Giles	Laura Howard	Sally is Vlad's human mother. The Count reveals to Vlad in series 5 that he met Sally at a Goth festival in Whitby when she was eighteen. After spending the weekend together she became pregnant with Vlad. She reveals her parents persuaded her to give Vlad up for adoption, but unknown to her it was the Count who secretly adopted him. After some internet research, Vlad discovers that Sally is a sculptor and invites her to Garside pretending to require her to design a sculpture. Vlad remains silent about who and what he really is, but it is not long until she discovers the family are vampires and Vlad is the son she had with the Count. After some encouragement from Vlad and George, Sally accepts Vlad's offer to stay at Garside for a few days so they can get to know each other. When Vlad officially becomes the chosen one, he tells Sally that it's not safe for her and George to stay in a world of vampires and tells her he will wipe their memories. Sally originally protests, but because of Vlad's insistence she agrees. She tells Vlad that she and George will always love him, then has a short romantic goodbye with the Count. Vlad gives her part of the yin and yang necklace he received from Talitha, and said by wearing the necklace he and Sally would always be connected. Even after the mindwipe Sally tells George that she loves the necklace and will never take it off.
Georgina "George" Giles	Bella Band	Vlad's half-sister and Sally's daughter. Her full name is Georgina, but she greatly dislikes being called it. She is about eleven years old and good at translating Latin, which proved useful when translating a scroll that saved Vlad and the Count from being condemned by the Vampire High Council. George cares a lot about Vlad and refers to him as her brother, not her half-brother. She continuously asked Vlad to move in with her and Sally, if not asking Sally to ask him. George was also the one who persuaded Sally to let them stay at Garside so they could get to know Vlad better. She also becomes close to Asan and Renfield. At the end of the series, her memory is wiped by Vlad as well as Sally's to keep them safe from the world of vampires.
Talitha	Elenor Gecks	Vlad's friend whom he met whilst on his world travels. Like Vlad, she does not drink human blood but soya blood substitute and is described by Ingrid and Malik as a hippie. Vlad eventually tells her he is half-human and that he is slowly losing his vampire powers. Talitha tries to help him reconnect to them, but without much success. When Vlad tried to get rid of his bodyguard from the Vampire High Council, she revealed to Vlad that she was his real bodyguard and had been protecting him since they first met. At the end of the series, she is the reason Vlad decides to remain a vampire when the Vampire High Council reveal to Vlad that all half vampire/half breathers have a choice to remain a vampire or become human at dawn on their eighteenth birthday. The two become romantically involved and leave Garside to travel the world again when Vlad receives his chosen one powers.
Piers	Mark Rowley	A Scottish breather who has extensive knowledge of vampires. He takes a great interest in Ingrid who finds him very annoying and originally wanted him to help her with her computer research involving members of the Vampire High Council. Later in the series, Piers rescues Ingrid from a secret passageway under Garside. She is afraid the whole time she is there and frequently hugs Piers in fear showing that she is slowly developing feelings for him. After the battle with the Blood Seed in the last episode, Piers revealed he had purchased Garside from the Count and tells Ingrid that she owns half of the property. At this, the two go on to live there together.
