= List of Tsukuyomi: Moon Phase characters =

The following is a list of characters from the Japanese anime and manga series Tsukuyomi: Moon Phase, written by Keitarō Arima. Some of the characters listed here are exclusive to the anime or manga while others appear in both.

== Main characters ==
Hazuki (葉月, Hazuki) / Luna (ルナ, Runa)

Voiced by: Chiwa Saito (Japanese); Monica Rial (English)

A 14-year-old selfish but adorable vampire, Hazuki was separated from her mother and restrained in a castle in Germany. She escapes the castle with Kouhei's help and flees to Japan in search of her mother. Much of the conflict between her and Kouhei stems from her giving him a vampire's "kiss", the act of drawing blood from a mortal, which normally turns the mortal into the feeding vampire's unwilling servant, but Hazuki's attempt on Kouhei fails. This is because Kouhei is a "Vampire Lover" and therefore is immune to the binding power of Hazuki's vampiric "kiss". Despite her continued claims that Kouhei is her slave and must obey her every command, Kouhei refuses to do so. Although she has trouble showing it, Hazuki truly comes to care for Kouhei and falls in love with him towards the end of the story.
Hazuki is also a host to an alternate personality named Luna. In the anime this cold-hearted persona was implanted in Hazuki by her father to make her more tractable. Luna can only emerge during the full moon through the use of a pendant but she can communicate with Hazuki mind-to-mind when Hazuki is under stress and can force her to do as she wishes. Originally, Hazuki lacks any memory from when Luna took over, but gradually due to Kouhei's influence Hazuki's personality becomes stronger. After killing Kinkell, the two personas merge and Hazuki is able to break free of Luna's influence. In contrast, the Luna persona that appears after Kinkell's death in the manga is timid and shy. In chapter 30, the two personalities merge after Hazuki feeds on Kouhei and she reveals that she remembers being called Luna before her mother started calling her Hazuki and she shut away in the castle.
Hazuki's family is desperate to retrieve her because she is a "daywalker", a vampire who, unlike others of her kind, can withstand sunlight. It is because of this ability that Hazuki was shut away in the castle, since if knowledge of her ability became widespread, all other vampires would hunt her to obtain the daywalker ability for themselves by feeding on her.
Kouhei Morioka (森丘 耕平, Morioka Kōhei)

Voiced by: Hiroshi Kamiya (Japanese); Jason Liebrecht (English)

Kouhei is a photographer who, due to an accident involving paranormal forces in his early childhood, is oblivious to spirits and the supernatural (which he specializes in photographing). He is an "Ama Lamia" (Vampire Lover), meaning no vampire can make him their servant. Furthermore, vampires who feed on him have their servitude ties with their masters broken, making of him a threat to the vampire society structure. Later, it is revealed that he possesses great spiritual powers which were sealed by his family to allow him to live a normal life, as they were too strong for him to control. In the anime, he has the seals on his power undone so that he can participate in the battle against Jeda and Balgus, but afterwards he once again seals his Jyougan away so that it won't affect his relationship with Hazuki. In the manga, he does not seal his Jyougan and trains to perfect his powers. From their first meeting, he and Hazuki have a tempestuous but affectionate relationship that turns into romance. In the manga, Kouhei's surname is Midou.
Artemis ("Arte")

Voiced by: Sawa Ishige (Japanese); Carrie Savage (English)

Hazuki's younger half-sister who was born to a different mother. She is a Shadow User. This means she can use her shadow and turn it into a scythe, or a replica of her, etc. In the manga, she was forcefully rejected by her father and taken into the care of Kouhei's father to act as a "replacement" in Hazuki's absence. Furthermore, in Chapter 77, it is hinted that Arte may be related to Kouhei in some way.
Artemis envies Hazuki because of the attention their family dedicates to her, and because of it Arte is determined to deprive Hazuki of everything and everyone she truly cares for, taking it by force or destroying it completely. However, Kouhei manages to reach out to her and convinces her to open up to a new life with caring friends and family. In the series finale, she is taken in by Morioka's family after the death of her grandfather and guardian, Fargus(Vargas).
Elfriede (エルフリーデ, Erufurīde)

Voiced by: Yumi Kakazu (Japanese); Stephanie Young (English)

Elfriede is Kinkell's daughter and servant and is able to summon creatures and monsters. She is a Ludo, a human who was converted into a vampire, and is truly Kinkell's biological daughter as well as his daughter in terms of vampire propagation by being bitten. Due to his cruelty to her adopted family when she was converted, she swore to avenge them. Kinkell's control over her was nullified when she fed on Kouhei's blood which is how she was able to aid him and Hazuki in destroying Kinkell. After Kinkell was defeated, she joined the Midou household and helps protect Hazuki from other vampires and their minions. Being close in chronological age to Rhyuuhei (although looking much younger), she quickly forms a relationship with him, possibly becoming romantically attracted to him.

== The Mido family ==
Ryuuhei Mido (御堂 竜平, Midō Ryūhei)

Voiced by: Mugihito (Japanese); Randy Tallman (English)

Ryuuhei is Kouhei's grandfather and a powerful spiritualist. Kouhei lives in his household, which is located in an antique shop. He agreed to take Hazuki in out of kindness, though he appears to have other motives for it as well including ascertaining the whereabouts of his daughter Shizuru (Kouhei's mother). Later in the tale, Ryuuhei develops a relationship with Elfriede. His "cradle-robbing" habits annoy those close to him.
Seiji Mido (御堂 成児, Midō Seiji)

Voiced by: Takahiro Sakurai (Japanese); Sonny Strait (English)

Kouhei's cousin and a powerful exorcist in his own right. Later in the series it is revealed that despite his extensive training, his powers are no match for Kouhei's latent potential. Because of this, Seiji is slightly jealous of Kouhei. He rarely loses his cool, often being the most level-headed of them. Seiji works for the same paranormal-investigation magazine as Kouhei and Hiromi. He writes under the name Seiji Mido (御堂 晴爾, Midō Seiji) (same pronunciation, different kanji).
Hikaru Mido (御堂 光, Midō Hikaru) and Kaoru Mido (御堂 薫, Midō Kaoru)

- Hikaru Voiced by: Mai Kadowaki (Japanese); Luci Christian (English)
- Kaoru Voiced by: Miyu Matsuki (Japanese); Brina Palencia (English)

Hikaru and Kaoru are twin sisters who, despite being younger than Hazuki, are pledged by their parents to marry Seiji and Kouhei respectively when they grow up. Hikaru is more outgoing and constantly picks fights with Hazuki. In the manga, Hikaru is bitten by The UnNamed One and becomes her slave. Kaoru, the quieter of the sisters, is somewhat clumsy and shy. Despite her shyness, she can also be quite mean to Hazuki, but this is likely due to jealousy of the fact that Hazuki lives with Kouhei.
Yayoi Mido (御堂 弥生, Midō Yayoi)

Voiced by: Jūrōta Kosugi (Japanese); Jason Douglas (English)

Yayoi is a powerful exorcist from the Midō family. He becomes Kouhei's sensei when Kouhei decides to become an exorcist like his relatives in order to be able to protect Hazuki.
Koharu Mido

Voiced by: Julie Mayfield (English)

Koharu is Kouhei's Grandma, and generally has a positive outlook on things as well as being wise. She is also a medium herself but due to her age gets weaker more quickly by using it.

== Vampires ==
Count Heinrich von Kinkell (ハインリヒ·フォン·キンケル, Hainrihi Fon Kinkeru)

Voiced by: Takashi Matsuyama (Japanese); Troy Baker (English)

One of the minions of Hazuki's family and charged with the stewardship of Shwartz Quelle castle where Hazuki was confined. He is also the father of Elfriede, having turned her into a vampire himself early in the 20th century. Count Kinkell is determined to retrieve Hazuki and prevent his superiors (mainly Hazuki's father), from finding out she escaped so as to avoid being punished for his lapse. He is able to control and bend light which allows him to create illusions, make things invisible and avoid being burned by sunlight. Kinkell finds out that Kouhei is an Ama Lamia and tries to kill him, but is defeated through the efforts of Kouhei and the others, including Elfriede, and is killed by Hazuki when she is able to drive a wooden stake through his heart, exposing him to daylight via his wound.
Jeda & Balgus
Jeda and Balgus both arrive with Artemis to find Hazuki, in the manga however they are sent by Mario. Jeda has evil eyes in the manga while in the anime he controls his surroundings to his advantage. He is more focused on the mission at hand. Balgus protects "The Princess" Artemis and she has grown a bond with him. He is big and strong but not as smart and gets killed by Jeda (In the manga Jeda kills him and takes his vampire abilities). It is later found out that Balgus was a grandfather to Artemis.
Mario
Mario is one of Oyakata's servants and caretaker of Hazuki. In both the anime and manga, Mario appears to kill Ryuuhei, and Elfriede the difference being that he gets killed himself in the anime while doing so.
Oyakata
Hazuki's father is in the manga and is mentioned in the anime. He is a very powerful vampire and has sent many vampires to find Hazuki. Oyakata finally retrieved Hazuki after possessing Freya.
Freya
A servant of Oyakata, Freya only appears in the manga and possesses Kaoru, causing her to try to seduce Kouhei in order to get to Hazuki. Freya can control animals. Freya is killed in chapter 72 by Oyakata for trying to hurt Hazuki.
The UnNamed One
At over 1,000 years old, the UnNamed One is an old vampire. She had a tree on the island Hazuki and Kouhei fled to in the manga that she used as her vessel to protect the island from demons. She is released after Hikaru goes to her and she sucks her blood thus making Hikaru her slave. The UnNamed One appears to be friendly and helps Kouhei get Hazuki back. Unlike most vampires she also doesn't abuse her new servant and only uses Hikaru when its "absolutely necessary", saying she doesn't like to use others or be used by other people.

== Others ==
Haiji (ハイジ, Haiji)

Voiced by: Vanilla Yamazaki (Japanese); Gwendolyn Lau (Cat) Luci Christian (Human) (English)

Haiji is Hazuki's guardian spirit who takes the form of a cat. Haiji originally belonged to Kouhei's mother, Shizuru, and was known as Akuda. Due to her long separation from Shizuru, Haiji weakened nearly to the point of death, but was revived when Ryuuhei and Seiji performed a ritual that transferred her loyalty to Hazuki. The spirit guardian lost most of her memories of Kouhei's mother as a result of the ritual. Since becoming Hazuki's shikigami, Haiji is able to transform from her original cat form to a toy-sized humanoid cat in traditional Japanese garb. In the last episode of the anime it's revealed that she wears very embarrassing underwear.
Hiromi Anzai (安西 ひろみ, Anzai Hiromi)

Voiced by: Michiko Neya (Japanese); Laura Bailey (English)

Hiromi is Kouhei's childhood friend and co-worker at an occult magazine, who assigns him various photo jobs. She has a notable crush on Seiji, which is not reciprocated. She is also a horrible driver and enjoys alcohol. Her relationship with Hazuki is much like that of a doting older sister, giving her clothes and other things only a girl would know to give her. Hazuki once used her hypnosis to make Hiromi buy her a bed, something Hiromi would have done for her anyway. She was turned into Kinkel's slave along with the Editor-in-Chief of the occult magazine, but was freed from him when the Count died; she lacks any memory of her time under the spell. Although Hazuki told Hiromi about the hypnosis, she remains unaware of Hazuki's true nature as a vampire.
Shizuru Morioka
Shizuru is Kouhei's Mother, she abandoned Kouhei when he was a little child for unknown reasons and disappeared. Ryuuhei has been looking for her ever since her last message to him was "Vampires do exist".
Akuda
Akuda is Hazuki's mother, she loved Hazuki very much and wanted what was best for her but like Shizuru she left for unknown reasons. One of the main drives for Hazuki and Kouhei in both the anime and the manga has been to find Hazuki's mom. In the anime it is found out that Hazuki's mother died mysteriously after leaving behind a messenger from her in the form of Haiji for her daughter.
