= Suck It Up (novel) =

2008 book by Brian Meehl

- Author: Brian Meehl
- Language: English
- Genre: Fiction
- Publisher: Delacorte Books
- Publication date: May 13, 2008
- Publication place: United States
- Media type: Print
- Pages: 323
- ISBN: 9780385903219
- OCLC: 1255441132
- LC Class: PZ7.M512817

Suck It Up is a young adult novel about a misfit, vegan, teenage vampire named Morning McCobb. It was written by Brian Meehl and published by Delacorte Books on May 13, 2008. It won the School Library Journal's award for "Best First Kiss".

== Summary ==
After graduating from the International Vampire League, a scrawny teenage vampire named Morning McCobb is given the chance to fulfill his childhood dream of becoming a superhero when he embarks on a mission to become the first vampire to reveal his identity to humans and to demonstrate how peacefully-evolved, blood-substitute-drinking vampires can use their powers to help humanity. He ends up falling for Portia Dredful, a beautiful, strong willed girl. Things get harder, however, as he has to resist the temptation of sucking Portia's blood.
