= The Festival (short story) =

1923 short story by H. P. Lovecraft

- Short story by H. P. Lovecraft
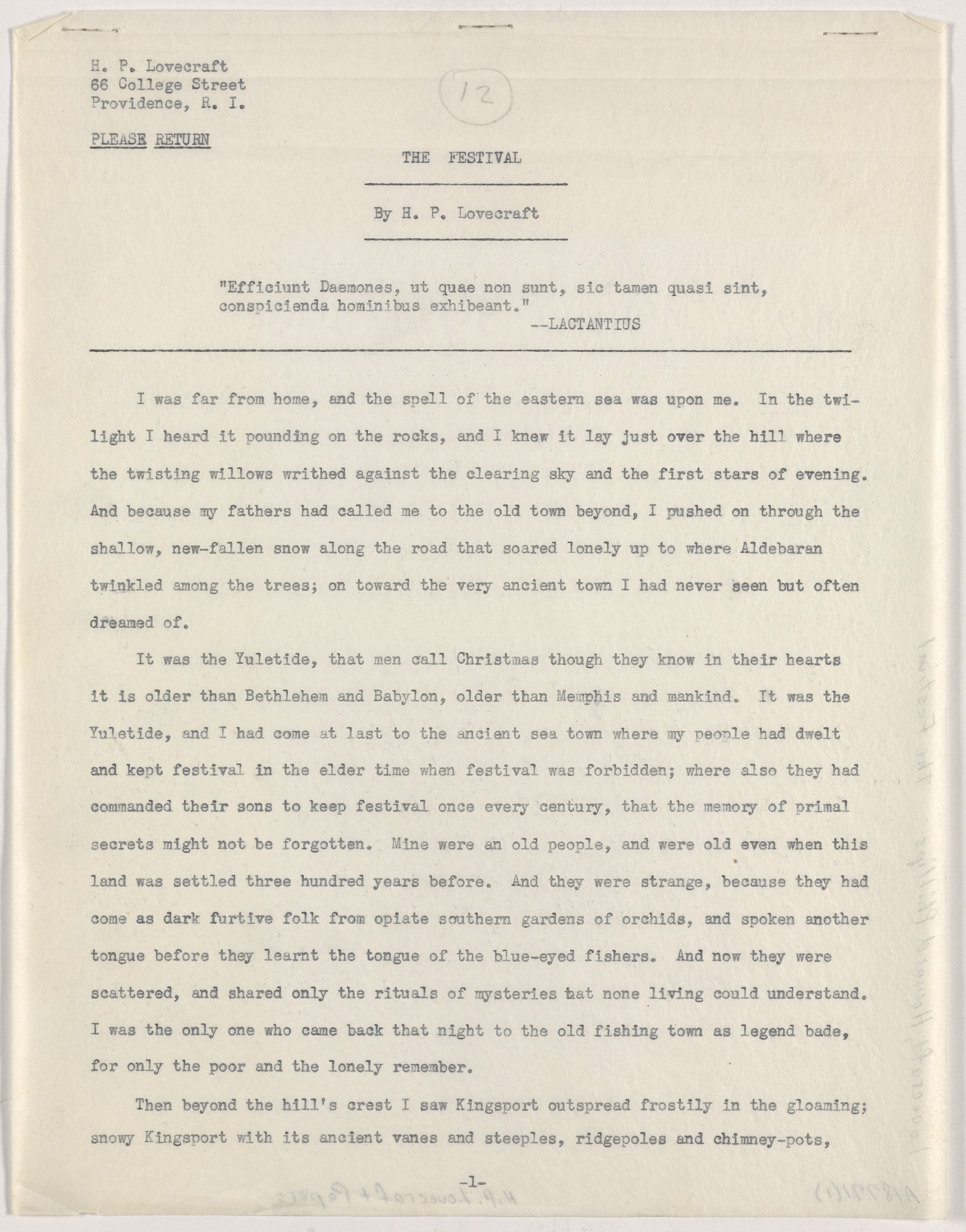

Text available at Wikisource
- Country: United States
- Language: English

Publication
- Published in: Weird Tales
- Publication type: Periodical
- Media type: Print (Magazine)
- Publication date: January 1925

"The Festival" is a short story by H. P. Lovecraft written in October 1923 and published in the January 1925 issue of Weird Tales.

== Inspiration ==
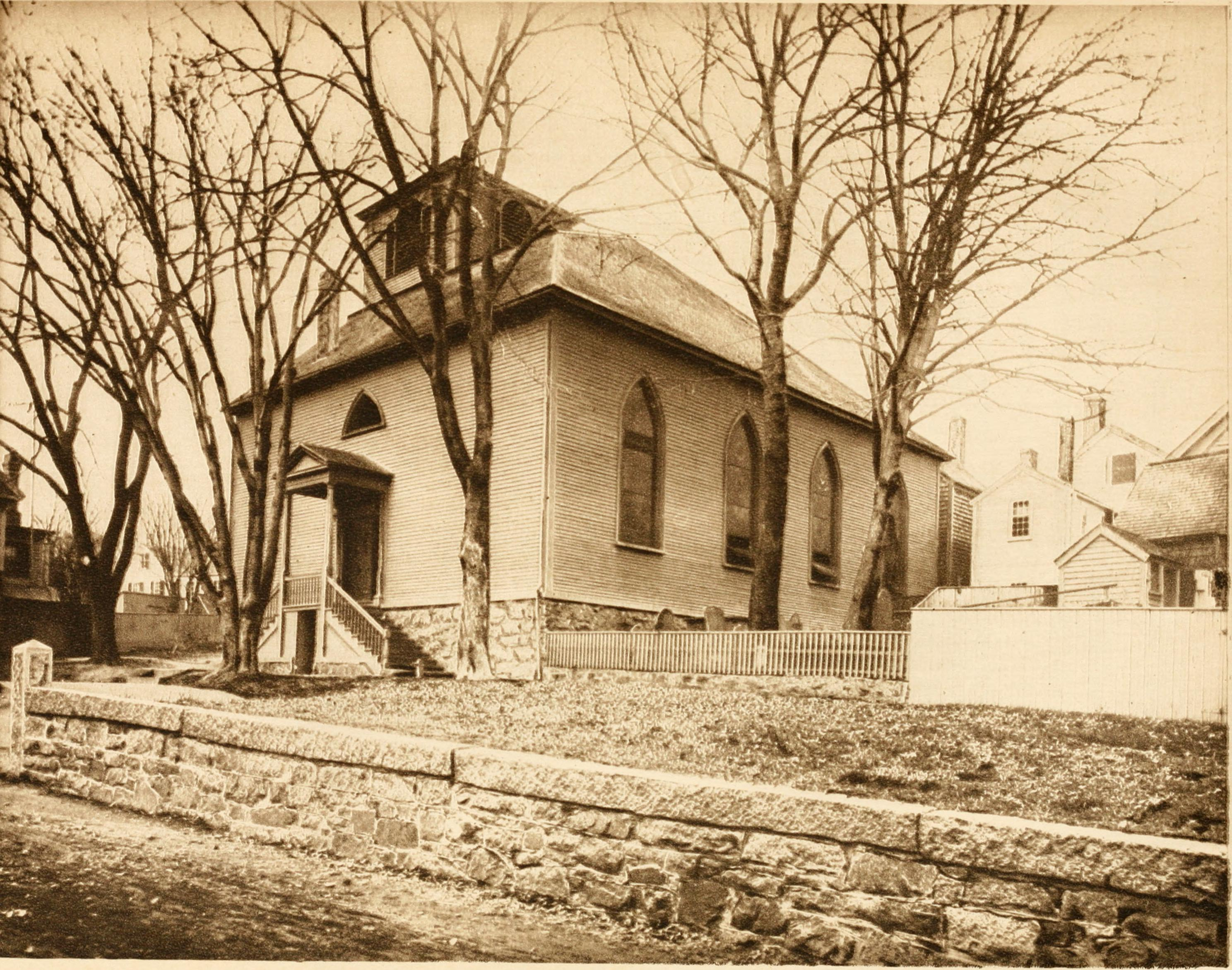
St. Michael's Episcopal Church, Marblehead, as it appeared in the early 20th century

The story was inspired by Lovecraft's first trip to Marblehead, Massachusetts, in December 1922. Lovecraft later called that visit "the most powerful single emotional climax experienced during my nearly forty years of existence."

In a flash all the past of New England—all the past of Old England—all the past of Anglo-Saxondom and the Western World—swept over me and identified me with the stupendous totality of all things in such a way as it never did before and never did again. That was the high tide of my life.

The narrator's path through Kingsport corresponds to a route to the center of Marblehead; the house with the overhanging second story is probably based on Marblehead's 1 Mugford Street. The church in the story is St. Michael's Episcopal Church on Frog Lane. Built in 1714, it is the oldest Anglican church in New England that is still standing at its original site. The church is on a modest hill; for most of the 18th century, it had a steeple. Its crypt, where parishioners were interred, remains. Since Lovecraft visited the church (as evidenced by his signature in the guest register), he may have spoken with the rector and learned such details about the church.

Lovecraft was also influenced by two books he had recently read:

In intimating an alien race I had in mind the survival of some clan of pre-Aryan sorcerers who preserved primitive rites like those of the witch-cult—I had just been reading Margaret Murray's The Witch-Cult in Western Europe."

Hence, he describes the narrator's folk as:

an old people, and... strange, because they had come as dark furtive folk from opiate southern gardens of orchids, and spoken another tongue before they learnt the tongue of the blue-eyed fishers.

The idea of "pre-Aryan" survivals was the basis of "The Novel of the Black Seal", a story in Arthur Machen's 1895 novel The Three Impostors. This story, too, had impressed Lovecraft when he read it not long before writing "The Festival"; it influenced the development of some of his later stories, including "The Call of Cthulhu" (written in 1926), "The Dunwich Horror" (written in 1928) and The Whisperer in Darkness (written in 1930).

== Synopsis ==
"It was the Yuletide," the story begins, "that men call Christmas though they know in their hearts it is older than Bethlehem and Babylon, older than Memphis and mankind." An unnamed narrator is making his first visit to Kingsport, Massachusetts, an "ancient sea town where my people had dwelt and kept festival in the elder time when festival was forbidden; where also they had commanded their sons to keep festival once every century, that the memory of primal secrets might not be forgotten."

The town he comes to, which shows little sign of habitation, seems centuries out of date

... with its ancient vanes and steeples, ridgepoles and chimney-pots, wharves and small bridges, willow-trees and graveyards; endless labyrinths of steep, narrow, crooked streets, and dizzy church-crowned central peak that time durst not touch; ceaseless mazes of colonial houses piled and scattered at all angles and levels like a child's disordered blocks; antiquity hovering on grey wings over winter-whitened gables and gambrel roofs; fanlights and small-paned windows one by one gleaming out in the cold dusk...

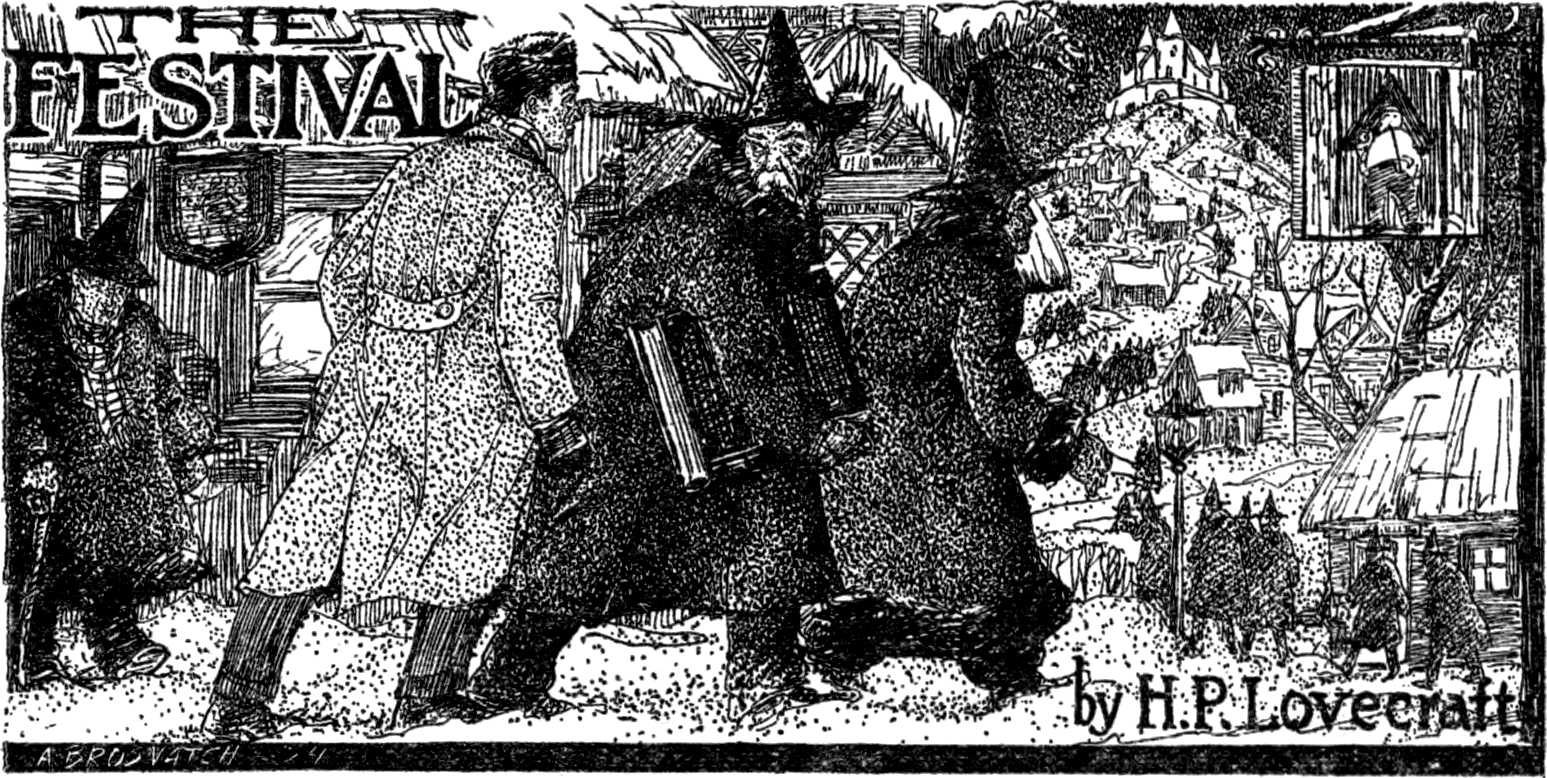

He locates his relatives' house, which has an overhanging second story, and is greeted by an unspeaking old man with "flabby hands, curiously gloved," and a "bland face" that he comes to suspect is "a fiendishly cunning mask". This mysterious greeter directs him to wait next to a pile of old books that includes a Latin translation of the Necronomicon, wherein he discovers "a thought and a legend too hideous for sanity or consciousness." At the stroke of 11, he is led outside to join a "throng of cowled, cloaked figures that poured silently from every doorway", heading to the "top of a high hill in the centre of the town, where perched a great white church." He follows the silent crowd, "jostled by elbows that seemed preternaturally soft, and pressed by chests and stomachs that seemed abnormally pulpy", into the church.

The procession enters a secret passageway below the crypt, eventually coming to "a vast fungous shore litten by a belching column of sick greenish flame and washed by a wide oily river that flowed from abysses frightful and unsuspected to join the blackest gulfs of immemorial ocean." There, they engage in a "Yule-rite, older than man and fated to survive him", while "something [is] amorphously squatted far away from the light, piping noisomely on a flute". The flute-playing summons

a horde of tame, trained, hybrid winged things that no sound eye could ever wholly grasp, or sound brain ever wholly remember. They were not altogether crows, nor moles, nor buzzards, nor ants, nor vampire bats, nor decomposed human beings; but something I cannot and must not recall. They flopped limply along, half with their webbed feet and half with their membranous wings; and as they reached the throng of celebrants the cowled figures seized and mounted them, and rode off one by one along the reaches of that unlighted river, into pits and galleries of panic where poison springs feed frightful and undiscoverable cataracts.

The narrator resists joining this expedition, even when his guide points out the family resemblance on his mask-like face, and shows him a watch with his family's arms that he recognizes as having "been buried with my great-great-great-great-grandfather in 1698." When a sudden effort to control one of the mounts "dislodged the waxen mask from what should have been his head", the narrator throws himself into the river "before the madness of my screams could bring down upon me all the charnel legions these pest-gulfs might conceal."

He awakens in a Kingsport hospital, where he looks out to find a much more modern town, and is told that he was rescued from Kingsport Harbour after footprints revealed he walked off a cliff. Agitated to learn that he is near Kingsport's old churchyard, he is transferred to St. Mary's Hospital in nearby Arkham, where he is allowed to read a copy of the Necronomicon and find the passage that so disturbed him at his ancestral house; he dares quote only one paragraph of it:

The nethermost caverns...are not for the fathoming of eyes that see; for their marvels are strange and terrific. Cursed the ground where dead thoughts live new and oddly bodied, and evil the mind that is held by no head. Wisely did Ibn Schacabao say, that happy is the tomb where no wizard hath lain, and happy the town at night whose wizards are all ashes. For it is of old rumour that the soul of the devil-bought hastes not from his charnel clay, but fats and instructs the very worm that gnaws; till out of corruption horrid life springs, and the dull scavengers of earth wax crafty to vex it and swell monstrous to plague it. Great holes secretly are digged where earth's pores ought to suffice, and things have learnt to walk that ought to crawl.

== Reception ==
Lovecraft himself did not think much of the story. Even so, Clark Ashton Smith, in a letter to Lovecraft dated October 1933, wrote: "In spite of your disparagement, 'The Festival' holds its place in my affections, and has an imaginative quality that puts it above the new stories in the current W.T." S. T. Joshi described "The Festival" as a story "of considerable interest", and stated "the story can be considered a virtual three-thousand-word prose-poem for the sustained modulation of its prose".

== Connections ==
Lin Carter, author of Lovecraft: A Look Behind the Cthulhu Mythos, calls "The Festival" "the first Mythos story to use witch-haunted Kingsport as a setting", and also credits it with advancing the lore of the Necronomicon, saying that it is "the first tale to give a lengthy quote from the imaginary book and to tell us something about its history (i.e., that Olaus Wormius translated it into Latin)." S. T. Joshi cites "The Unnamable", written a month before "The Festival", as the first story to use Arkham as a setting, but "The Festival" clearly has closer connections to the mythos than "The Unnamable".

The Case of Charles Dexter Ward (1927) mentions "the exposure of nameless rites at the strange little fishing village of Kingsport, in the province of the Massachusetts-Bay," an apparent reference to "The Festival".

The motif of a character's nonhuman identity being concealed by a mask is used again by Lovecraft in "The Whisperer in Darkness", The Dream-Quest of Unknown Kadath and "Through the Gates of the Silver Key".

It is suggested by enthusiasts of the Cthulhu Mythos that the short story features the first appearance of the byakhees, the winged creatures mentioned. They would be later included in August Derleth's tale "The House on Curwen Street".

The fragment of Necronomicon cited in "The Festival" served as inspiration for one of the major plots of Brian Lumley's Titus Crow novel The Burrowers Beneath, in which it is quoted. The fragment is also quoted in the survival horror game Signalis (2022), developed by German studio rose-engine.

== Adaptation ==
"The Festival", "The Picture in the House" (1921) and "The Dunwich Horror" (1929) were adapted into short claymation films. These were released in the DVD-Video collection H. P. Lovecraft's The Dunwich Horror and Other Stories (H・P・ラヴクラフトのダニッチ・ホラー その他の物語, Ecchi Pī Ravukurafuto no Danicchi Horā Sonota no Monogatari) by Toei Animation in August 2007.
