= Boma =

Boma or BOMA may refer to:

== People ==
- Boma Iyaye (born 1969), Nigerian accountant and politician
- Kévin Boma (born 2002), Togolese footballer

== Places ==
- Boma, Democratic Republic of the Congo, a port city
  - Boma Airport near Boma, Congo
- Boma, Guinea, in Nzérékoré Prefecture
- Boma Plateau, a region of eastern South Sudan
- Boma State, a state of South Sudan
- Boma Upande, a settlement in Kenya's Coast Province
- Boma (Ponda), a village in the Ponda sub-district of Goa

== Other uses ==
- Boma people, a Bantu ethnic group in the Democratic Republic of the Congo
- Boma language, a Bantu language of the Democratic Republic of the Congo
- Boma Kingdom, a pre-colonial state in the Democratic Republic of the Congo
- Building Owners and Managers Association (BOMA International), a trade organization founded in 1907 for commercial real estate professionals
- Boma clan, living in Nigeria
- Boma (enclosure), a rural fortress or livestock pen in Africa, from this also meaning a district government office or district center in countries which were British colonies in Africa
- Boma (administrative division), the smallest unit of local government in South Sudan
- Boma, an African style restaurant in hotel Disney's Animal Kingdom Lodge in Orlando, Florida
- Boma or Borma, a character in the science fiction manga Ghost in the Shell

== See also ==
- Bomas of Kenya, a tourist village in Langata, Nairobi
