= Lord of the Worms =

- Short story by Brian Lumley
- Country: United States
- Language: English
- Genre: Horror

Publication
- Published in: Weirdbook 17
- Publication type: Magazine
- Publisher: Weirdbook Press
- Media type: Print
- Publication date: 1983
- Series: Titus Crow

Lord of the Worms is a 1983 horror novella by Brian Lumley.

== Plot ==
Titus Crow interviews for a job with Julian Carstairs in 1946, at his house near Haslemere, and passes. Carstairs apparently wishes his enormous library of occult works cataloged. He gives Crow drugged wine at dinner and later watches him as he sleeps, along with another man. He commands him to believe that it was a dream. Crow begins work, later finding several pinkish maggots in the house. He swiftly becomes addicted to the wine.

Crow grows suspicious, but Carstairs hypnotizes him to forget the cause. He also intercepts a letter to Carstairs from Somerset House, concerning his inquiries about Crow's date of birth. He successfully deceives Carstairs by making a telephone call and disguising his voice. He visits friends in London and has one analyze the wine and the other hypnotize him, so that he cannot be controlled by Carstairs. He also visits an old friend at the British Museum and scrutinizes their Latin copy of De Vermis Mysteriis, particularly the chapter "Saracenic Rituals". The wine does turn out to be addictive, but he has been cured by the hypnosis of his friend, though he takes steps to pretend to be addicted. Carstairs offers him wine and he cannot refuse. Later that night, Carstairs visits him with two men and command him to come in the morning and ask to stay over the weekend. He pretends to obey. When Carstairs leaves, he inspects the library and discovers a secret door, giving onto steps leading down to the cellar. The weekend passes slowly. At last Carstairs leaves for a time, allowing Crow to inspect the cellar. He also finds Carstair's study unlocked and the missing pages from Carstairs' copy of De Vermis Mysteriis. Upon reading them, he suddenly realises that Carstairs intends to possess his younger body to prolong his life, having been born in Chorazin in 1602.

Carstairs eventually performs the Ritual of the Worm, on Candlemas Eve, in the cellars, believing Crow to be under his control. Crow surprises him by refusing his hand. He reveals his true date of birth. The ritual fails, as Carstairs' acolytes flee, refusing his hand also. The worms devour Carstairs entirely as Crow flees the house. His car passes over the now dead worms as he leaves.

== Characters ==
Titus Crow

Julian Carstairs

Owner of a large and rambling house named The Burrows.

Taylor Ainsworth

Chemist

Harry Townley

Crow's family doctor, Hypnotist

Sedgewick

Curator of the Rare Books Department at the British Museum.

Durrell

Acolyte of the Cult of the Worm. Clumsy.

Garbett

Acolyte

== Publication history ==
- Weirdbook 17 (1983) ISSN 8755-7452
- The Compleat Crow (1987, 1997, 2014)
- Return of the Deep Ones and Other Mythos Tales (1994)
- Harry Keogh: Necroscope and Other Weird Heroes! (2003, 2005)
- The Taint and Other Novellas (2007, 2008)
