= Blood Brothers (Lumley novel) =

1992 book by Brian Lumley

- Cover of the first edition
- Author: Brian Lumley
- Cover artist: George Underwood
- Language: English
- Series: Necroscope series
- Genre: Horror, Science fiction, Adventure
- Publisher: Roc UK
- Publication date: 1992
- Publication place: United Kingdom
- Media type: Print (hardback & paperback)
- Preceded by: Necroscope V: Deadspawn (1991)
- Followed by: The Last Aerie (1993)

Blood Brothers is the sixth book in the Necroscope series by British writer Brian Lumley. This was the first book in the Vampire World Trilogy. It was released in 1992.

== Plot ==
It is revealed that after the Battle in the Garden (Necroscope III: The Source), while recovering from the ravaging of his mind by his son, The Dweller, Harry Keogh, fathered two sons unknowingly with a Szgany woman Nana Kiklu, in Starside/Sunside. The book covers the boys growing up among the Szgany of Lardis Lidesci. With the vampires destroyed (Necroscope V: Deadspawn) by Harry Keogh and Lady Karen with the help of the wolf, The Dweller the Szgany have stopped traveling and settled into towns. The boys grow up with their mother in the Lidesci town named Settlement with their friends and especially a girl named Misha and Lardis' son Jason. The boys suffer from dreams and sometimes nightmares of people whispering in their graves and they also talk to three wild wolves who for reasons unknown to them call the boys their uncles.

We also learn of a long-forgotten part of the world to the far east of the known Starside/Sunside. Discovered a long time ago by an exiled Wamphyri Lords Turgo Zolte, it is now home to around 40 Wamphyri Lords and Ladies and similar Szgany tribes all under the command of the Lord Vormulac Unsleep. But whereas the Szgany of old Starside fights back against the Wamphyri, the Szgany in Turgosheim have become worn down and supplicant. They settle in towns and allow the many Wamphyri to visit and take as they want, using a tithe system where they are forced to choose or find a certain number of "volunteers" to be taken and used by the Wamphyri. Aggravated and tired of the Turgosheim life and aware that the land in the west is free of vampires, a group of six travelers flee Turgosheim for the west.

As they grow older Nathan and Nestor's once close relationship deteriorates due in part because of their affection for Misha. While they are fighting over the Szgany girl, their unprepared village is attacked by the Wamphyri led by Wratha. After the attack Nathan journeys away from Settlement, believing his mother, brother, and Misha have been taken by the Wamphyri. He ends up alone, weary and destitute, and ready to die in the desert. His dead speak thoughts are answered by a dead elder of the underground desert dwellers, the telepathic Thyre. Wanting to help Nathan, the dead Thyre Rogei guides him to a resting place of their ancients, where he is found by the guards there.

Nestor, also injured in the attack on the village, ends up in the hills, his memory damaged due to a head injury and believing he is a Wampnyri Lord. Nestor witnesses a duel between two rival Wamphyri Lords, Vasagi the Suck and Wran Killglance, who are part of Wrathas group out of Turgosheim. His intervention in the form of a crossbow bolt fired into Vasagi allows the Killglance Brother to win. He is then "rewarded" by Wran for his help with Vasagi's egg and he becomes Wamphyri.

Nathan, previously shunned by the dead of the Szgany, is immediately taken in by the Thyre. He becomes famous among them and communicates with their dead and makes many friends. Nathan becomes a conduit for the dead Thyre to talk to and teach the living Thyre. He helps reunite lost loved ones and tells them of new contraptions and inventions they have designed while dead. Learning to use his telepathy while traveling east with the Thyre across their many towns and underground outposts, Nathan eventually ends up in Turgosheim.

In Turgosheim Nathan finds a supplicant Szgany tribe and is put into the tithe, where he is taken to the manse of the Wampnyri Lord Maglore The Mage. Intrigued by Nathan's intelligence, colours and demeanour, Maglore does not vampirise him, instead choosing to keep him around as a companion or "pet". Nathan spends many months in Maglore's manse learning about Turgosheim and he also meets another untouched human, the Szgany girl Orlea. All the time keeping his powers and mentalism hidden from the Wamphyri, Lord Nathan eventually 'escapes' on a flyer and goes back to western sunside and the Szgany Lidesci, where he is reunited with his mother and marries Misha.

Upon Nathan's return, Nestor senses him and is enraged to find him back. Believing in his broken mind that Nathan is an "old enemy," Nestor attacks Nathan and Misha along with his lieutenant Zahar. Injured in the brisk skirmish, Nestor's flyer crashes near a leper colony, but not before Nathan is thrown through the Perchorsk gate by Zahar on Nestors orders.
