= Mwene Muji =

Polity in the Congo Basin

- c. 1400–c. 1900
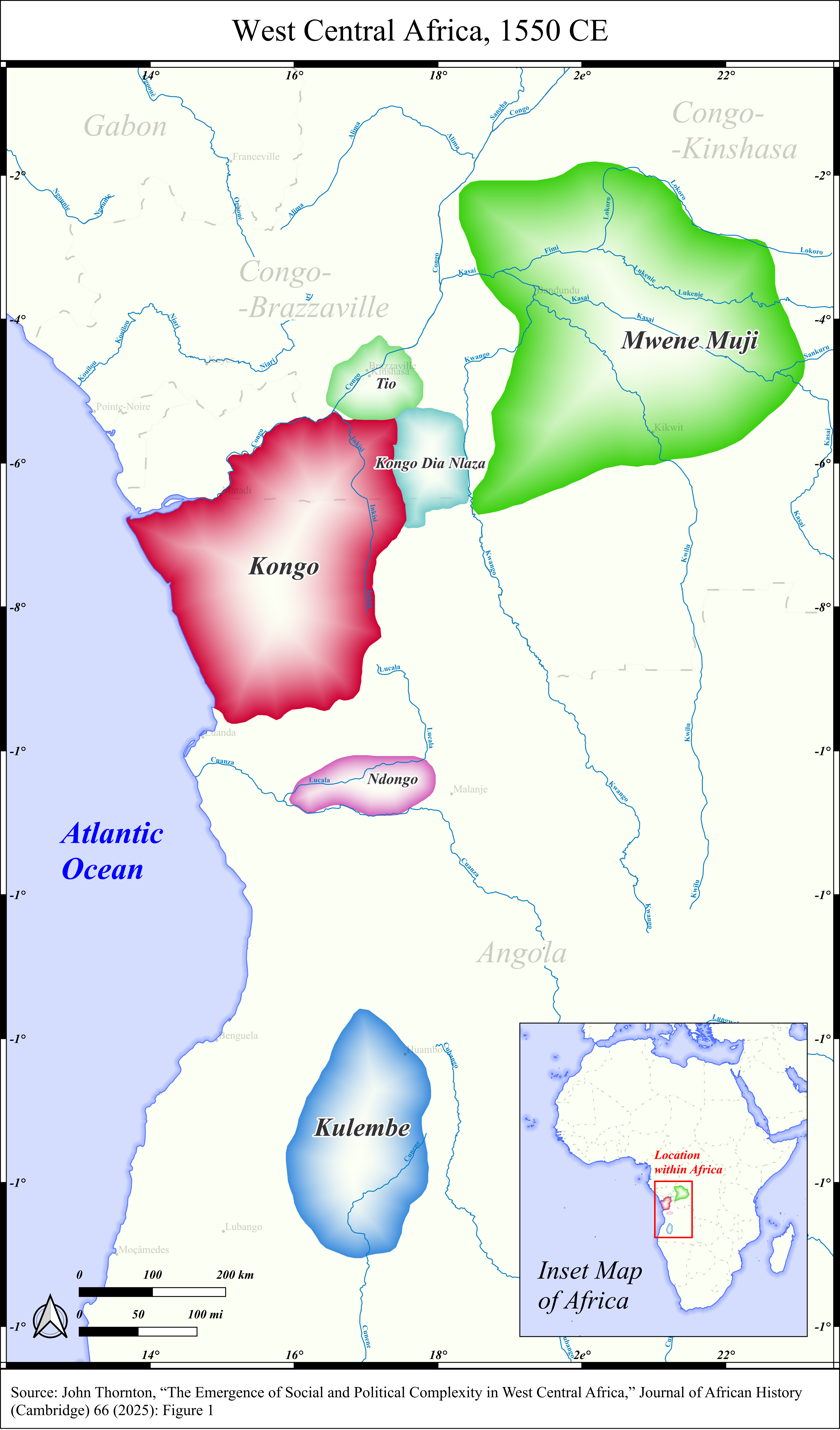
- Major states of the western Congo Basin, including Mwene Muji, c. 1550
- Capital: Mushie
- Mwene Muji/Nimi a Maye
  - c. 1900: Muba
- History
  - Established: c. 1400
  - The Boma, Yaka, and Bozanga break away: Early-17th century
  - Disestablished: c. 1900
Succeeded by
Jaga (Kongo)
Yaka Kingdom
Boma Kingdom
Bozanga Kingdom
Congo Free State

Mwene Muji (Note: Also called Monemugi, Monmuge, Moenemugi, and Nimiamye.) was a polity proposed by John Thornton, located around Lake Mai-Ndombe in the Congo Basin, likely stretching south to Idiofa. It bordered the Tio Kingdom among others to its southwest. Mwene Muji dominated the region of the Lower Kasai. It was ruled by the BaNunu, holding the titles of Ntote. Its unity crumbled in the early-17th century, with the Boma Kingdom, Yaka Kingdom, and Bozanga breaking away. Mwene Muji entered a further severe decline in the 19th century and was surpassed by the Boma Kingdom, on the eve of Belgian conquest in the early-20th century. Its 'empire' status is pending on further archaeological research. (Note: The BantuFirst project undertook an archaeological survey from 2018–2023, and stated that sites dated between the 13th and 17th centuries indicated "expansive political/social/economic entities".)

The first written record of Mwene Muji came in 1591 by Italian explorer Filippo Pigafetta. The name Monemugi was erroneously applied to Unyamwezi in modern-day Tanzania near Lake Malawi.

== History ==
Mwene Muji was formed just after 1400 (going by traditional oral king lists), and it likely expanded along the Lukenie, Kasai, Kamtsha, Kwilu, and Wamba rivers, without venturing much into the interior. It would have had a powerful riverine navy, (Note: Its navy included kekupi which were canoes with 30 paddlers) and dominated trade. It produced and exported fine cloth.

At Mwene Muji's height, it covered much of the Lower Kasai Basin and may have included parts of the territory of the Kuba and Pende kingdoms. The Jaga who invaded the Kingdom of Kongo in the 16th century originated from a province of Mwene Muji.

In the early-17th century the polity lost its unity. Successor kingdoms broke away such as the Boma Kingdom, Yaka Kingdom, and Bozanga Kingdom. The Boma took over the north, while the Yaka took over some southern domains, diminishing Mwene Muji's power and influence.

According to Jan Vansina, Dwantole was the earliest remembered king of the Nunu reigning in the mid-19th century, and Bokoko was the fifth-most reigning c. 1880. When the steamers of the Congo Free State came into use, Mwene Muji lost its naval supremacy and thus its dominance over trade. Deadly epidemics swept the region in the 1890s, dispersing the population. The Boma Kingdom became the main power in the region. The region was conquered by the Belgians in the early-20th century. By the time the Belgians began collecting traditions, the capital Mushie appeared to be a small fishing village and the grand claims from its ruler Muba of them once having imperial status were swept aside. Its 'empire' status is pending on further archaeological research.

== Boma oral tradition ==
Boma oral traditions collected in 1926 account how the Boma came to the region fleeing their elders, who were forcing them to work in mines, following leaders. Their elders, the Ngeli, then returned to conquer them. The 'leaders' and original founders are likely to be the Ntote of Mwene Muji, and representing the Boma kings (Ngeliboma) as elders of them gives them legitimacy.

== In European maps ==
In 1591 Filippo Pigafetta wrote of the "empire" of Monemugi in his book Relatione del Reame di Congo, and placed it in East Africa on his map. Monemugi was placed on some maps to cover the vast unknown area between the Congo, Mutapa, and Abyssinia. A summary of European geographical knowledge of Africa published in 1918 placed Monemugi in modern-day Malawi, speculating that its inhabitants were the Nyamwezi or Maravi. Thus the name Monemugi was considered for the name of the modern country of Malawi.
