= The E-Branch Guide to Psionics =

Tabletop horror role-playing game supplement

- Designers: Miranda Horner; George R. Strayton
- Publishers: West End Games
- Publication: 1996; 29 years ago
- Genres: Horror
- ISBN: 978-0874314786

The E-Branch Guide to Psionics is a 1996 role-playing game supplement for Brian Lumley's The World of Necroscope published by West End Games.

== Contents ==
The E-Branch Guide to Psionics is a supplement about the top-secret British government organization known as E-Branch, which performs intelligence operations using psychic powers.

== Reception ==
Andy Butcher reviewed The E-Branch Guide to Psionics for Arcane magazine, rating it a 5 out of 10 overall. Butcher comments that "Fans of Lumley will be interested to see how the powers, which help maintain Necroscope's unique feel, have been implemented in the game. But even then it's hardly required reading for more casual players."

Pyramid magazine reviewed The E-Branch Guide to Psionics and stated that "While the cover may not clearly imply the contents of the book (being the vampiric skull originally used as the cover to the first Necroscope novel), the introduction quickly dispels all doubts."
