= Necroscope =

Horror novel series by Brian Lumley

- Author: Brian Lumley
- Country: United Kingdom
- Language: English
- Genre: Horror, Science fiction, Adventure
- Publisher: Grafton (UK); HarperCollins (US)
- Published: 1986-2013
- Media type: Print (Paperback)

Necroscope is the title of a series of horror novels by British author Brian Lumley.

The term necroscope, as defined in the series, describes someone who can communicate with the dead (coined Deadspeak later in the series). Unlike necromancers, who here extract the knowledge they seek by brutal eviscerations of corpses, a necroscope can communicate with them as equals: peacefully and without any physical interference. The abilities of a necroscope are defined as a type of extrasensory perception (ESP).

== Plot summary ==
Harry Keogh (born Harry Snaith), the Necroscope, is born with the ability to speak to the dead. As he grows up and his power manifests itself, he befriends the dead, known as the Great Majority, and learns from them that death is not the end. He believes that although the body dies, the mind goes on and the dead continue to improve and expand in death what they loved in life. From him, they learn to communicate amongst themselves, and love Harry for it. In turn, the Great Majority offer him their knowledge. While Harry is at school, a deceased math teacher helps him with his developing mathematics talent and an ex-army sergeant teacher imparts self-defense skills.

As the years go by, he has recurring dreams about his mother, dead after an apparent ice-skating accident but in reality murdered by her husband – Harry's stepfather Victor Shukshin. Shukshin is a psychic sensitive, a defector sleeper agent planted in England by the Soviet E-Branch. In his self-appointed mission to avenge his mother's death, Harry is dragged into a web of espionage involving British and Soviet ESP agencies.

This leads to Harry learning to use the Möbius Continuum (from its discoverer August Ferdinand Möbius himself, at his grave in Leipzig, Germany), which allows him to instantaneously transport himself anywhere in the multi-dimensional universe.

From that point on, Keogh, backed by the British E-Branch, works to rid the human world of a vampire menace, a mission that will eventually lead him to a parallel world called Sunside/Starside. This vampire-dominated world is connected to Earth via two portals, one in Romania (the original "source" of vampires on Earth) and a second, recent one in the Soviet-run Pechorsk Project in the Urals. It is on Sunside/Starside that Harry Keogh's final death eventually meets up with him, after he has lost his family, his friends, even his deadspeak and numeracy, but not his humanity.

In the Möbius Continuum, Harry's essence explodes in a burst of golden light, and from that explosion a myriad of golden darts, each a part of Harry, come forth.

Each of those golden darts carry a part of Keogh, and can join with hosts to grant them some of the abilities of the original Necroscope. Later books in the series tell the stories of individuals touched by these darts: Nathan Kiklu, Jake Cutter and Scott St. John. The darts seek to continue their mission in life, and so bond to individuals who will come up against the Necroscope's old foes, the Wamphyri, and menaces of diabolic nature.

Harry's physical remains, infected by the spores of the vampire Faethor Ferenczy, were sent back in time by the Möbius Continuum and ended up in the marshes of Sunside/Starside, making him the source of the vampire plague when his own spores infected the exiled Shaitan who becomes the first Wamphyri Lord.

== Books in the series ==
#	Title	1st Edition	Series
1.	Necroscope	1986	Necroscope
2.	Necroscope II: Wamphyri	1988	Necroscope
3.	Necroscope III: The Source	1989	Necroscope
4.	Necroscope IV: Deadspeak	1990	Necroscope
5.	Necroscope V: Deadspawn	1991	Necroscope
6.	Blood Brothers	1992	Vampire World
7.	The Last Aerie	1993	Vampire World
8.	Bloodwars	1994	Vampire World
9.	Necroscope: The Lost Years (Volume I)	1995	The Lost Years
10.	Necroscope: Resurgence, The Lost Years (Volume II)	1996	The Lost Years
11.	Necroscope: Invaders	1999	E-Branch
12.	Necroscope: Defilers	2000	E-Branch
13.	Necroscope: Avengers	2001	E-Branch
14.	Harry Keogh: Necroscope and Other Weird Heroes	2003	Supplemental
15.	Necroscope: The Touch	2006	New Adventures of the Necroscope
16.	Necroscope: Harry and the Pirates	2009	Supplemental
17.	Necroscope: The Plague-Bearer	2010	The Lost Years
18.	Necroscope: The Möbius Murders	2013	The Lost Years

== Main characters ==
=== Harry Keogh, Necroscope ===
The main protagonist of the series. Harry's grandmother was a Russian immigrant who settled in Great Britain. His father died when he was very young. His mother later remarried and was eventually killed by Harry's stepfather. During his early childhood, Keogh lived with an aunt and uncle in County Durham in North East England. Keogh would eventually return to exact vengeance on his Russian stepfather.

While at school, being not particularly popular or academically inclined, Harry discovers his ability to speak to people who have died. He also, in most part due to this ability, shows great aptitude in the fields of mathematics and creative writing.

The author also puts forward the idea that death is not the end, and that whatever someone was or wished to be in life, he or she continues to be in death, within the restraints that death imposes. For example, a mathematician would continue perfecting his math, an inventor would keep inventing new things, and a psychic would continue to practice using their powers.

Not only can Harry speak to the dead (thus earning him their eternal admiration, almost amounting to worship), but he can also form a bond with them which allows them a degree of control over him when he permits. For example, when faced with a dangerous situation, Harry hands his mind over to the control of a former gym teacher who was an army sergeant, and learns martial arts skills. He does not forget what he learns, and continues to use this skill and many others throughout the series. In addition, if the dead are nearby and the physical situation permits, they will literally raise themselves up out of the ground and fight for him. This gives him powerful allies as, being dead already, they have nothing to lose and almost nothing to fear.

Harry is also able to teleport anywhere in the world via the Möbius continuum, which he learned from August Ferdinand Möbius. By employing advanced equations learned through his dead tutor and his intuitive mathematical mind, Harry can conjure a door in space and enter the Möbius continuum, he can then create another door to exit. There is no time in the continuum, so teleportation is instant. Harry is also able to open a past or future time door and observe what may be, but he cannot appear there physically.

==== Powers ====
In total, Harry Keogh has six different ESP talents by the end of the first series of five books:

- Deadspeak: an evolution of his mother's talent as a psychic medium.
- Teleportation: technically space-time manipulation, learned from August Ferdinand Möbius.
- A 'mind-blanket': gifted by the deceased Norman Wellesly which completely blanks his mind out.
- Telepathy: learned from the E-Branch telepath Trevor Jordan.
- Locator: by connecting with another mind, Harry can locate and appear near them.
- Resurrection-type Necromancy: by means of a spoken incantation, learned during a battle against the vampire Janos Ferenczy, Harry can bring the dead back to full animation. Readers of H. P. Lovecraft's works will note that the same incantation from his works appears here. Lumley is well known for his extension of the Cthulhu mythos (the Titus Crow novels et al.), and this to some extent acts as a tie-in to Titus Crow universe and to the Mythos in general.

=== Harry Jr./The Dweller ===
Harry Jr. is the son of Harry with his wife Brenda. Harry Jr. shows immense intelligence even as toddler and has even greater powers than his father.

Choosing to flee from Earth after an attack by the vampire Yulian Bodescu, the baby Harry Jr., showing even greater mastery over the Möbius continuum than his father, transports himself and his mother to the parallel universe of Starside/Sunside and also back in time by twenty years.

Living on Starside with his mother, Harry Jr. is vampirised by an 'infected' wolf and becomes Wamphyri and is named 'The Dweller in His Garden in the West' by the world's fearful inhabitants. Hiding his Wamphyri features behind a golden mask and black cloak – he shuns the Wamphyri lifestyle, instead using his immense willpower to hold his vampire at bay.

The Dweller forms an alliance with the Szgany Lidesci (the planet's gypsy-like humans) but becomes infamous among the Wamphyri of Starside because of his mysterious powers. Fearing him, they form an alliance to attack him at his garden in the mountains.

Severely injured during the battle, his vampire leech re-shapes his damaged body into that of a more simple entity, a wolf, to save both their lives. His injuries were immense, and with much less mass, rebuilding damaged tissue and bone was easier. The exception to this transformation was his hands, which he willed remain, so that the Szgany may know him, and so that he too would have a reminder of the man he once was.

The change removes his ability to use the Möbius continuum, leaving him with just Deadspeak and telepathy. His mind soon wanes and he loses touch with his humanity, preferring to take the company of his Starside/Sunside wolf brethren.

=== Nathan Keogh/Kiklu ===
He is Harry's other child with a Szgany traveller woman Nana Kiklu. Born in the vampire world of Sunside/Starside with his twin brother Nestor, Nathan is at first the quietest and most withdrawn of the two and is thought of as dumb by some of the Szgany tribe due to his lack of confidence, his stutter and unwillingness to speak, only talking to those closest to him.

Inheriting his fathers deadspeak powers Nathan hears the thoughts of the dead in his dreams but they refuse to talk to him, wary of him as they had been his father at the end of his life. He also communicates with three friendly wolves which talk to him telepathically while he sleeps, although not knowing why or understanding how Nathan takes them as just dreams. By the trilogy's end, it is revealed that they are the Dweller's pups, born with intelligence rivalling man, with their father's Deadspeak and sense of direction (the ability that Harry Jr/The Dweller used in finding the way to Sunside/Starside).

Everything changes for Nathan when his village on Sunside is attacked by Wamphyri. Seeking his lost brother, he leaves on a long journey of discovery taking him across the whole of Sunside/Starside. Becoming strong and confident, losing his stutter, and learning to use his long dormant telepathy while on his travels, he eventually returns to his Szgany clan before being taken by the Wamphyri and is thrown through a gate to Earth.

Arriving in a Russian base, he escapes and is found by the British E-Branch who teach him of his heritage and his true father. More importantly, Nathan finally learns the ways of teleportation via the Möbius continuum like his father.

With the help of the British E-Branch, Nathan returns to his own world and wages war on the Wamphyri.

=== Jake Cutter ===
Chosen by the spirit of the dead Harry Keogh, Jake is spotted and recruited by the British E-Branch where he is tutored and taught about Harry's legacy and deadspeak and eventually masters the Möbius continuum.

=== Scott St. John ===
While in mourning for his dead wife, Scott is struck by a fragment of Harry and becomes a Necroscope.

== Wamphyri ==
The main antagonists of the series, the Wamphyri Lords (pronounced "Vam-Fear-Eee") are maleficent, primeval and dominating predatory creatures. Lumley reinterpreted the traditional vampire legend, working mostly within the rules set by Bram Stoker's Dracula. In his stories, vampires are a leech-like creatures from an alien world that form a symbiotic relationship with a host creature, usually a human or sometimes an animal. While the symbiosis puts great demands on the host, such as feeding on blood, the benefits include increased strength, speed, and resilience; a seemingly infinite lifespan; magnified senses; base emotional stimulation; access to latent psychic power; shapeshifting; and certain narcotic effects, including control over weak-minded people.

Vampiric leeches begin their original life cycle as a fungus formed from the decomposed flesh and fats of a deceased vampire. When a suitable host is detected, the fungus releases spores that slowly adapt the victim's body to suit the growth of a leech. During the transformation, hosts show traditional signs of vampirism, such as aversion to light and garlic. The next stage is a death-like catatonia, which can be immediately induced through direct transmission of bodily fluids, such as bite or sex. Powerful vampires can be quickly created by infusing the host with a leech's egg, but most leeches lay only one egg during their lifetime. "Mothers", which can lay multiple eggs, are widely feared for their ability to quickly produce an army of vampires, but vampire legends say the process can make Mothers become a lifeless husk.

In the Necroscope series, vampires are described as being divided into several classes: lesser vampiric creatures consisting of animals that may have been infected for a purpose or merely escaped; thralls, who have no will of their own but have abilities beyond that of a human; lieutenants, who are more powerful thralls; eggsons and eggdaughters, who come from eggs; bloodsons and blooddaughters, who are vampires born from sexual intercourse with humans; and lords and ladies, known as the "true wamphyri". Lords and ladies have adult leeches, and their abilities far surpass that of thralls. Although it is conceivable that lords or ladies could be killed through starvation or grievous bodily harm, the only reliable way to kill them is by decapitation or immolation – preferably both. Vampires can regenerate from injuries as long as their leech remains alive, and a dead leech's psychic consciousness can persist through the fungal stage, if it is powerful enough. Certain virulent diseases, such as leprosy, can slowly kill vampires through centuries of suffering.

Wamphyri control their own planet, but Earth has shorter nights, better technology, and more humans which make vampires more vulnerable. They generally favor subtlety while on Earth. Vampires consider the flesh of human children a delicacy, though they also eat fruits and drink wine. Some vampires attempt to maintain their humanity, but this does not usually last. Wamphyrii psychology is based around intensified emotional states. They are constantly fearful of anyone they consider a threat and may avoid their own kind. Lesser vampires are frequently ambitious to rise in rank, partly out of lust for power, but also to escape the abuse of higher ranking vampires. Vampire society resembles the pack structure of wild social predators. They need social interaction but within rigid structures of control and dominance. Vampires in Lumley's novels are most often bisexual to some extent and frequently engage in various forms of incest and abuse with their offspring either by blood or by egg. The most desired treat is another vampire's leech or blood, so cannibalism is also common.

== Supplemental bibliography ==
- Miranda Horner, Daniel Scot Palter, Brian Sean Perry and Jesse VanValkenburg. Deadspeak Dossier (1995)
- Miranda Horner and George R. Strayton. The E-Branch Guide to Psionics (1996)
- Edward Bolme and Andrew Heckt. Wamphyri (1996)
- Mark Barnabo, Edward S. Bolme, Angel McCoy, and Christopher E. Wolf. Operation: Nightside (1997)
