= The Last Aerie =

- Cover of the first edition
- Author: Brian Lumley
- Language: English
- Series: Necroscope series
- Genre: Horror, Science fiction, Adventure
- Publisher: HarperCollins
- Publication date: 1993
- Publication place: United Kingdom
- Media type: Print (Hardback & Paperback)
- Preceded by: Blood Brothers (1992)
- Followed by: Bloodwars (1994)

The Last Aerie is the seventh book in the Necroscope series by British writer Brian Lumley, and the second in the Vampire World Trilogy. It was released in 1993.

== Plot ==
Sixteen years in the past on Earth Ben Trask along with other members of British E-Branch awake to a nightmare and feel compelled to go to their HQ in London, where they find each other waiting. Once there they use their combined ESP powers to project a hologram of the nightmare into view.

They see a body of a man all burned and blackened by fire spinning in the darkness, suddenly he explodes and disappears into golden shards of light, one of the shards seems to come right out of the image and fly out of the room. They realize they have witnessed the death of Harry Keogh in the vampire world. (Necroscope V: Deadspawn)

Back in the present on Earth, Nathan is trapped, stuck inside the entrance of the wormhole gate in Perchorsk in Russia. Unsure if Nathan is human or Wamphyri the commander of Perchorsk, Turkur Tzonov, a telepath, contacts British E-Branch for help. Ben Trask and Ian Goodly agree to go to Perchork as advisors.

Once at Perchork, Ben's talent immediately tells him Nathan is human. Nathan is moved to a cell in the complex where Turkur begins interrogation, but Nathan stays quiet, only using his telepathy to talk to Ben. He realizes that the British knew his father (having learned this from reading Turkur's mind), and wants to know more so he accepts their help. Another Russian telepath Siggi Dam feels sorry for Nathan and allows him to escape. He flees into the mountains where he is finally intercepted by a British special forces helicopter and taken to England.

Once there he is told about his father and speaks to some of Harry's dead friends. E-Branch also tell him of the Möbius continuum and how Harry could teleport. Eager to learn this ability as he already has the numbers in him, Nathan starts to learn mathematics from a tutor but soon surpasses him. He then starts taking lessons from members of the dead, in particular Harry's own teacher a dead British headmaster.

E-branch also shares with Nathan the location of the second gate in Romania which he can use to go home, but Nathan must wait until the river there is at its lowest to get to the entrance, so he spends many months with the British learning about the world and his father.

While Nathan and Zek Foener are on a trip to visit the grave of her husband Jazz Simmons, they are attacked by Turkur's men (still trying to recapture Nathan). Having nowhere to run they are forced to swim in the ocean. Meanwhile, in England Ian and David Chung know something is happening and turn on a computer in Harry's room in the E-branch Headquarters. A golden dart flies out of it and disappears. It finds Nathan who is still hiding in the ocean and in danger, and strikes him. By this blow he instantaneously learns Harry's knowledge of the Möbius mathematics and how to transport. He teleports both himself and Zek straight back to the E-Branch office though the Continuum.

While all this has been happening on Earth, back in the vampire world Nestor has ascended as the Wamphyri Lord Nestor Lichloathe, and has discovered the dread power of Necromancy. He is also inflicted with leprosy from crashing his flyer into the leper village. The Wamphyri of Turgosheim have also been busy as well, been making flyers and fighting beasts to follow Lady Wratha's group across to the west in order to wage war against them.
