= The Horror at Oakdeene =

- Short story by Brian Lumley
- Cover showing Spellman (right) with Yibb-Tstll (left)
- Country: United Kingdom
- Language: English
- Genre: Fantasy

Publication
- Published in: The Horror at Oakdeene and Others
- Publication type: Anthology
- Publisher: Arkham House
- Media type: Print (Hardcover)
- Publication date: 1977

"The Horror at Oakdeene" is a 1977 horror novella by Brian Lumley.

== Plot ==
Martin Spellman is a trainee mental nurse at Oakdeene Sanitarium in 1935. He desires to be an author and is using the inmates cases as sources for a possible book. Two other trainees there are Alan Barstowe and Harold Moody. Eventually he is invited to look at the file of one Wilfred Larner, who became insane due to his occult research, particularly the Black Book (Larner's amateur translation of the Cthäat Aquadingen). Spellman is allowed to study Larner's materials. He later makes an enemy of Barstowe, whom the inmates seem to both fear and hate. Later an inmate dies during Barstowe's shift, having apparently gouged out one of his own eyes. Larner later asks Spellman for a copy of the Sixth Sathlatta, from the Cthäat Aquadingen, to deal with "a matter of justice". Spellman studies the chant and the notes, which involve Yibb-Tstll. Later Spellman sees Yibb-Tstll in a dream, after reciting the Sixth Sathlatta, but believes it to have been a coincidence. He gives Larner the promised information and a crayon to write with. He later observes Larner passing information to eleven other inmates in the exercise yard. Larner later confirms that they intend to call Yibb-Tstll, and apologizes to Spellman about the consequences, especially the "reversals and penalties" involved in performing the ritual without using the Naach-Tith formula. Larner and the others attempt to build the Naach-Tith Barrier, using the formula, but they know only the first part. Spelllman again pronounces the Sixth Sathlatta and dreams of Yibb-Tstll, this time recognizing that it has smiled at him. On New Years Day, he learns that Barstowe has quit his job. That night he again dreams of Yibb-Tstll, in an alien clearing. The twelve other inmates are also there for the calling. Spellman refuses to participate, but Yibb-Tstll forces him to.

Barstowe is later found outside the grounds of the Sanitarium, having been killed in a hideous manner. Five of the 13 are completely cured and five others are found dead, including Larner. Spellman is a victim of a reversal and is now kept sedated in a cell.

== Connections to Cthulhu Mythos ==
Several "cases" from Lovecraft's works are mentioned, such as those of Joe Slater and Robert Olmstead's cousin.

== Publishing history ==
Lumley submitted this novella to August Derleth in 1970, but it was not published until 1977, after Derleth's death, in The Horror at Oakdeene and Others. It was reprinted in The Taint and other novellas in 2007.
