= Necroscope: The Lost Years: Volume II =

1996 novel by Brian Lumley

- Author: Brian Lumley
- Language: English
- Publication date: 1996

Necroscope: The Lost Years: Volume II is a 1996 novel written by Brian Lumley.

== Plot summary ==
Necroscope: The Lost Years: Volume II is a novel in which Harry Keogh now inhabits the borrowed body of Alec Kyle—a brain-dead man—and Harry faces a fractured existence, having lost his family amidst the chaos of his identity shift. As he searches for his wife and child, he allies with a centuries-old vampire thrall whose master, a wounded werewolf, is recovering from a historic feud with fellow banished Wamphyri. Keogh's true identity remains hidden from these dangerous adversaries, who believe he is merely Kyle. This mistaken assumption gives Harry the advantage as he works to disrupt their schemes from behind the scenes, setting the stage for suspenseful twists built on a web of coincidence and secrecy.

== Publication history ==
Necroscope: The Lost Years — Volume II marks the fifth installment in Brian Lumley's long-running vampire saga.

== Reception ==
Jonathan Palmer reviewed Necroscope: The Lost Years: Volume II for Arcane magazine, rating it a 7 out of 10 overall, and stated that "This is a refreshing vampire fantasy, and rather scary, too. If you've not read any Necroscope books before, you would be better off starting at the beginning - there are basic assumptions that have to be taken on board before these works can be appreciated. However, if you have little difficulty in suspending your disbelief when reading dark vampire fantasy, you could equally start here, at the end. After all, that's a beginning, too."

== Reviews ==
- Don D'Ammassa (1997) in Science Fiction Chronicle, April/May 1997
