= Necroscope IV: Deadspeak =

- Author: Brian Lumley
- Language: English
- Series: Necroscope series
- Genre: Horror, Science fiction, Adventure
- Publisher: HarperCollins
- Publication date: 1990
- Publication place: United Kingdom
- Media type: Print (Hardback & Paperback)
- Preceded by: Necroscope III: The Source (1989)
- Followed by: Necroscope V: Deadspawn (1991)

Necroscope IV: Deadspeak is the fourth book in the Necroscope series by British writer Brian Lumley. It was released in 1990.

== Plot ==
Several years after his return to earth Harry Sr. is troubled by nightmares of resurgent Vampires. These nightmares are messages from the dead who he is unable to communicate with when awake due to the actions of Harry Jr.

Separately E-Branch is investigating drug smuggling in the Mediterranean when two of its agents are assaulted. One is vampirized and the other rendered insane.

Harry Sr's new girlfriend, Sandra, herself secretly a member of E-Branch, plays a pivotal role in bringing Harry into the mix. She had been assigned to watch him and if possible restore his powers and reports to the head of E-Branch, Norman Harold Wellesley, on his status. Wellesley's talent is his thoughts can't be read and this makes him the perfect sleeper agent for the Russian E-Branch/KGB community.

Afraid that Harry may be recovering his old powers, or perhaps developing new ones, the Russians choose to eliminate him and instruct Wellesley to take care of him. The plot fails due to the intervention of the dead, and in the process Sandra's status as an agent is revealed, as is the fact that Ken and Trevor are in trouble, and that the dead want Harry in the Mediterranean.

Together Harry, Sandra, and Darcy go out to check on the situation. During the course of the investigation they learn that the drug smuggler is a resurrected Janos Ferenczy, using the alias Jianni Lazarides. They find that Ken Layard has been kidnapped and vampirized, and Sandra was able to see into Trevor Jordan's mind and realizes that he is effectively insane.

Faethor speaks to Harry in a dream and instructs him to come to Romania, where he says he can restore his deadspeak. During the fateful night, Harry discovers that Janos Ferenczy is Faethor’s bloodson. He was produced from the union of Faethor and a precognitive gypsy named Marilena, whom Faethor fell in love with. Faethor describes Janos as the finest telepath he has ever known and instructs Harry to take the fight to Janos and not be afraid to get inside his mind.

Harry ends up sleeping outside Faethor's Ploiesti resting place and when he awakes the next morning, he discovered he was surrounded by odd black mushrooms that exploded at the slightest touch releasing their spores into the air, which he breathed. Overnight Faether had restored his Deadspeak as promised, and untangled most of Harry's mental troubles. However not being a mathematician he was unable to restore the command of numbers and access to the Mobius Continuum.

When Harry returns to Rhodes, he finds that Sandra has been kidnapped and vampirized. Darcy and Manolis, a local Greek policeman they have taken into their confidence, are able to kill one of Janos' thralls, and Harry speaks to him after to find out where Janos has gone. They later speak to Trevor Jordan and find that his mind has completely been taken over by Janos, who forces Trevor to kill himself in front of Harry, Darcy and Manolis.

With his deadspeak restored Harry sought out and again spoke to Mobius himself, who recruited other mathematicians to help with the problem as Harry approached Janos' lair slowly. Harry began showing signs of developing telepathy and possibly other powers in his own right, a fact he initially put down to his mind compensating for the long lack of his other abilities.

During the final confrontation against Janos and his vampire thralls a group of Thracians raised from their ashes by Janos to help him instead took Harry's side and assisted him. This along with the timely restoration of his teleportation abilities through the Mobius Continuum allowed Harry to defeat Janos. The book closes shortly after Harry and the last Thracian stake and behead the vampirized Sandra.

== Reception ==
In a mixed review, Jeff Zaleski and Petter Cannon of Publishers Weekly wrote, "Despite a tendency to overreach his descriptive power and the dated Cold War background, Lumley (Psychomech) tells a fast-moving tale of the primal horror of an undead parasite worthy of Stoker's original." In a positive review, Fear's John Gilbert said, "Like the vampires it so full-bloodedly portrays, Brian Lumley's Necroscope series just gets stronger. His lively mix of action and monstrosity transmutes the base cliché of the vampire and turns it into a wonderfully contemporary bane." In a mixed review, Andy Sawyer of Paperback Inferno said, "The conventions are more those of the thriller than the vampire or Lovecraftian genres: frequent crude writing, but occasional compelling ideas among the metaphysics." The book was reviewed by Stefan Dziemianowicz in the Crypt of Cthulhu.

John Gregory Betancourt stated in Weird Tales, "There were only two elements I disliked in Deadspeak: First, the introduction of magic. (Though the series has the trappings of horror, the "supernatural" abilities demonstrated — right down to the vampires themselves have all been explained in a thoroughly pseudo-scientific way thus far. The existence of working magic undercuts the rationalism behind the earlier books' basic premise.)" He concluded, "Though not quite up to the level of the earlier books, it's close. Four instead of five stars. Fans of the series won't want to miss it."
