= Filippo Pigafetta =

Venetian mathematician and explorer (1533–1604)

Filippo Pigafetta (1533–1604) was a Venetian mathematician and explorer.

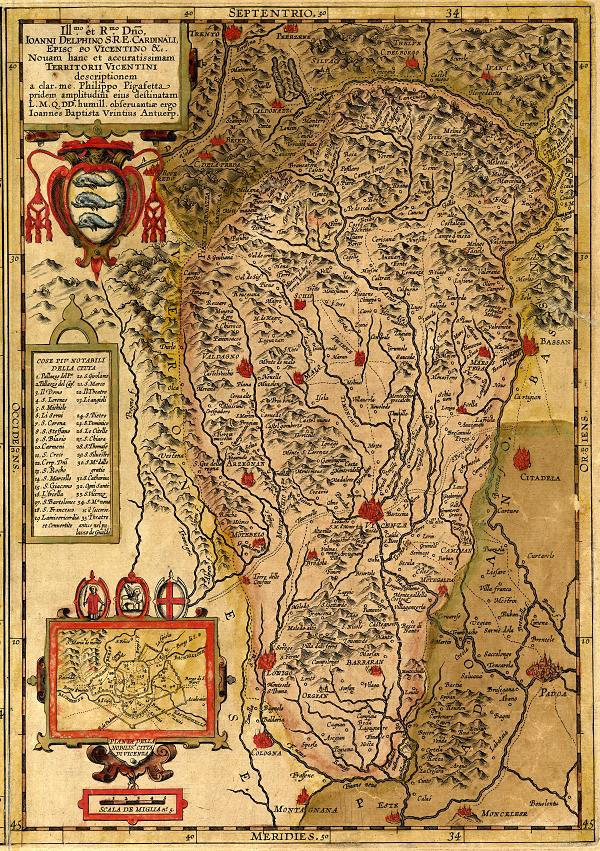
Map of Vicenza country. From Filippo Pigafetta, Novam hanc et accuratissima Territorii Vicentini descriptionem, in Abraham Ortelius, Theatro del mondo, Anversa, 1608. Vicenza, Biblioteca Civica Bertoliana.

Pigafetta's Relatione del reame del Congo (A Report of the Kingdom of Congo and of the Surrounding Countries) 1591 was translated into English, Latin (as Regnum Congo), French, Dutch and German. In it Pigafetta explains that he was ordered by Pope Sixtus V to transcribe the account of Duarte Lopez, a Portuguese trader who had spent twelve years in the Congo. Lopez had hoped that the pope would give him support in his mission to the Congolese, but this was not forthcoming: he returned to Africa, and was not heard from again. Lopez's narrative gives a detailed account of his voyage on his uncle's ship, and the history and geography of the kingdom of Congo and its six administrative regions under the rule of its king (named by Lopez 'Don Alvarez'). The account demonstrates the extent of Portuguese exploration across West Central Africa in the sixteenth century, of which later explorers were unaware.

In 1608 Pigafetta published an Italian version of the Theatrum Orbis Terrarum of Abraham Ortelius.

== Legacy ==
Pigafetta's Regnum Congo plays an important role in H. P. Lovecraft's short story "The Picture in the House".

== Works ==
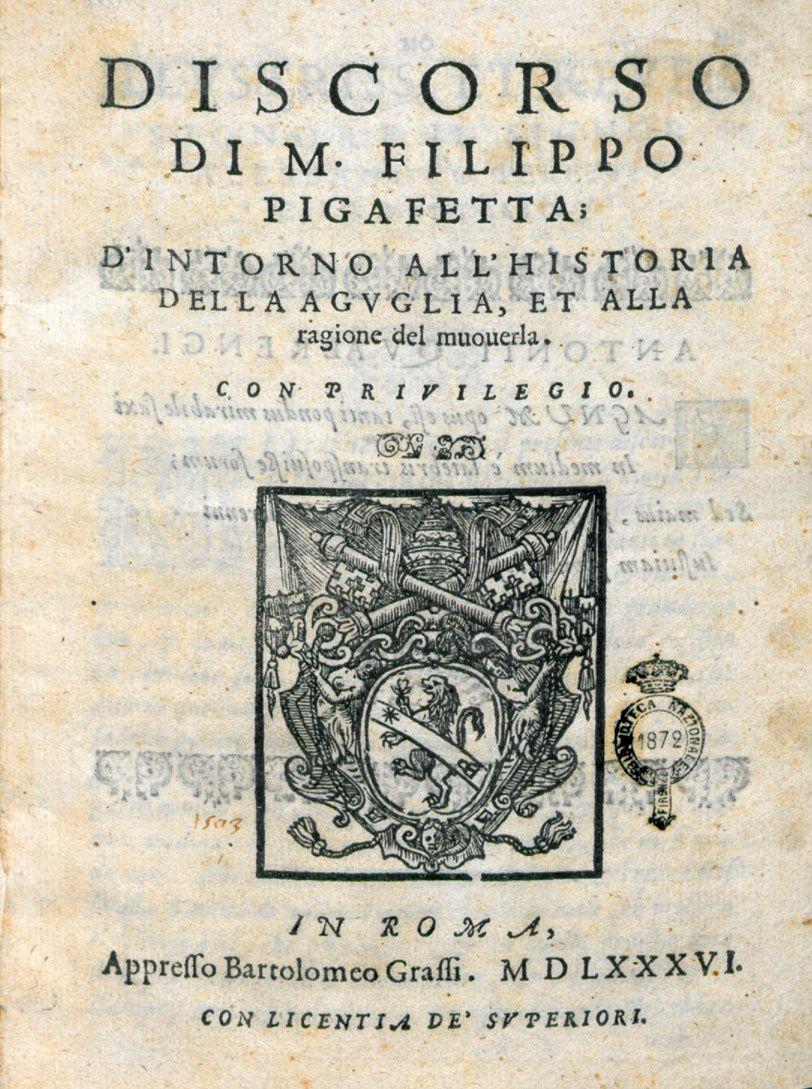
Discorso d'intorno all'historia della aguglia et alla ragione del muoverla, 1586

- (tr.) Le mechaniche by Guidobaldo del Monte. 1581.
- Discorso d'intorno all'historia della aguglia et alla ragione del muoverla (in Italian). Roma: Bartolomeo Grassi. 1586.
- Discorso di M. Filippo Pigafetta d'intorno all'historia della aguglia, et alla ragione del muouerla, 1586
- (tr.) Trattato Brieve dello Schierare in Ordinanza gli Eserciti et dell'apparecchiamento della guerra by Leo VI the Wise, 1586.
- Relatione del Reame di Congo et delle circonvicine contrade tratta dalli scritti & ragionamenti di Odoardo Lopez Portoghese, 1591.
  - Translated by Abraham Hartwell as A report of the kingdome of Congo, a region of Africa : And of the countries that border rounde about the same. 1. Wherein is also shewed, that the two zones torrida & frigida, are not onely habitable, but inhabited, and very temperate, contrary to the opinion of the old philosophers. 2. That the blacke colour which is in the skinnes of the Ethiopians and Negroes &c. proceedeth not from the sunne. 3. And that the Riuer Nilus springeth not out of the mountains of the Moone, as hath been heretofore beleeued: together with the true cause of the rising and increasing thereof. 4. Besides the description of diuers plants, fishes and beastes, that are found in those countries. Drawen out of the writinges and discourses of Odoardo Lopez a Portingall, by Philippo Pigafetta, 1597.
- (tr.) Compendio dal Theatro del Mondo by Abraham Ortelius. 1612. Translated from the Latin Theatrum Orbis Terrarum.

== See also ==
- Olfert Dapper
- Diogo Cão
- Mwene Muji
