= Necroscope II: Wamphyri =

1988 novel by Brian Lumley

Necroscope II: Vamphyri!
- First edition
- Author: Brian Lumley
- Cover artist: Bob Eggleton
- Language: English
- Series: Necroscope series
- Genre: Horror, Science fiction, Adventure
- Publisher: Grafton
- Publication date: 1988
- Publication place: United Kingdom
- Media type: Print (Hardback & Paperback)
- Pages: 509
- ISBN: 0-586-20000-2
- Preceded by: Necroscope (1986)
- Followed by: Necroscope III: The Source (1989)

Necroscope II: Wamphyri! is the second book in the Necroscope series by British writer Brian Lumley. It was released in 1988 by Tor Books.

== Plot ==
The spirit of Harry Keogh resides in his son, Harry Jr. When his infant son sleeps, Harry can roam the Continuum and speak to the dead, but is losing control as the son "reels" his father's spirit back in.

Harry discovers that Thibor had infected a pregnant woman, which results in a lesser breed of vampire. This youth, Yulian Bodescu, retains many vampire abilities: hypnotism, increased lust, bodily transformation, regeneration, and creating thralls.

Harry contacts Faethor Ferenczy, a master manipulator, who was not ready to die but was forced to when he was pinned beneath an unmovable column. When Faethor died, a small worm like creature left his body, which was also killed. Harry discovers that the creature is the "true" vampire and source of the Wamphyri power, longevity, and when the two beings are merged, they are Wamphyri.

Faethor tells Harry about how he infected Thibor with his sole wamphyric egg. Thibor was to watch over Faethor's castle and servants while gone, but after disobeying him, Faethor had him chained underneath the earth.

Yulian is creating thralls out of his family, and Thibor uses telepathy to tell him that Harry Jr. is a great enemy. Yulian sets out to kill the infant, and Harry informs E-Branch that Thibor has a piece of dead skin left behind, which could be used to further Yulian's mutation. E-Branch teams up with the current Russian head to destroy Thibor's remains and a "finger mutation" left behind in Castle Ferenczy.

After destroying the remains of Thibor, Alec Kyle is captured by rogue Russian agents believing him to be a spy. With the assistance of Zek Foener they mindwipe him and steal his knowledge of British E-Branch and Harry Keogh. Zek Foener learns she has been tricked and vows never to use her talents for the Russians again.

As Yulian prepares to murder Harry Jr, he uses the powers he learned from his father's mind and slips through the Möbius Continuum to E-Branch HQ with his mother Brenda, while the dead rise to slaughter Yulian Bodescu. Harry Jr. releases his fathers consciousness, which is drawn to inhabit the now mindless body of Alec Kyle. Enraged at what the Russians have done to Alec Kyle, Harry destroys the Russian HQ. Harry then realizes his son and wife have disappeared.
