= Psychomech =

1984 novel by Brian Lumley

- First edition
- Author: Brian Lumley
- Language: English
- Series: "Psychomech Trilogy"
- Genre: Horror, Fantasy, Science fiction
- Publisher: Panther Books
- Publication date: 1984
- Publication place: United Kingdom
- Media type: Print (Paperback)
- Pages: 336 pp
- ISBN: 0-312-85371-8

Psychomech is a horror novel written by Brian Lumley and published by Panther Books in 1984. This book is approximately 334 pages in length and focuses on the events in the life of Richard Garrison, a corporal in the British Royal Military Police, after meeting Thomas Schroeder, a rich German industrialist. The novel focuses heavily on the idea of extra-sensory perception (ESP).

== Plot ==
Richard Garrison is a corporal in the Royal Military Police who is disturbed by repeated nightmares involving a silver car, black dog, two men, a beautiful unseen girl, a Machine and a man-God and ending in an explosion. Thomas Schroeder, a German industrialist, along with his trusted companion and employee Willy Koenig, are brought to Ireland on business. Members of the IRA try to prevent Schroeder from developing in Ireland by kidnapping his wife. While Schroeder and Koenig are able to beat the IRA at their own game of intimidation, they underestimate them and are left frantically trying to return to their hotel rooms as they learn that a bomb has been planted in the building, again threatening the lives of Schroeder's wife and son. Garrison's and Schroeder's lives cross paths as Garrison is ordered to escort Schroeder to his hotel room in search of his wife and son. Garrison manages to save the lives of Schroeder, his wife and his son just as the bomb explodes in the room, as predicted in his dream. The explosion leaves Garrison blind and cripples Schroeder, reducing his life expectancy to a mere two years.

Schroeder brings Garrison to his home in Germany in an attempt to repay his debt. While there Garrison meets Vicki Maler, the daughter of a friend of Schroeder who is also blind, and the two quickly become involved. Schroeder meanwhile tries to help Garrison in his blindness with gadgets and a highly trained guide dog. Schroeder also reveals to Garrison his belief in extra-sensory perception (ESP) and that he has had both his, Garrison's and even Vicki's fortunes read. Schroeder is to die within two years, Vicki is to die within only one year, and Garrison is to meet a "T", a "Machine" and eventually be merged with "TS" – partially agreeing with the events of his former nightmares. Schroeder explains that he believes that after his death he will return and his consciousness will merge with that of Garrisons. Garrison is sceptical at first, but after Schroeder shows how he is able to test for ESP ability, revealing Garrison's strong natural ability in the process, Garrison changes his opinion and makes a pact with Schroeder. Schroeder will give Garrison money and power now in exchange for the rebirth in Garrison that is to come.

Vicki leaves Garrison to travel the world in the year remaining to her. Garrison asks Schroeder to have her body cryogenically frozen after her death in response to another dream where he saw her frozen body. Garrison returns to England with the new wealth and connections Schroeder has given him. Schroeder eventually dies and Garrison is able to feel it through a telepathic connection. Soon after Koenig comes to Garrison, ordered by Schroeder to keep him safe, and informs him that Schroeder's home in Germany now belongs to him.

For the next few years Garrison learns from Koenig as the two become closer friends. Garrison first overcomes his limitations due to his blindness, increases his wealth and power as he learns more about business and even increases his supernatural mental powers. "T" is revealed to him one night in a dream somewhere in Italy with danger surrounding her. Garrison and Koenig travel to Italy to find Terri, rescuing her from trouble just in time. Already knowing it must happen from his dreams, Garrison soon marries Terri and for a few years they live together in relative happiness.

Unbeknown to Garrison, Terri was once intimately acquainted with a psychiatrist Gareth Wyatt who is harbouring Hans Mass, née Otto Krippner, a Nazi who once tried to build a machine to create supermen for Hitler. Wyatt is using Mass to again try to build this machine, Psychomech, for which he will then take the credit and the profit. While Wyatt believes this machine only to be a tool to use to overcome one's fears, Mass' true purpose for this machine is to amply a person's ESP abilities and thus create a race of supermen. Mass succeeds but Wyatt murders him to prevent being caught for his role in harbouring a Nazi war criminal.

Wyatt runs into Terri at a party in England and both having learned that she is now married to a rich and powerful man and being in need of money, tries to again seduce her in the hopes of extorting money. Terri arranges for Wyatt to meet Garrison, who quickly agrees to lend financial and technical support to Wyatt when he realises that Wyatt's Psychomech is the Machine in his dreams.

Terri and Wyatt fall in love and plot to rid themselves of Garrison. After rebuilding and improving Psychomech, Garrison decides to be its trial subject. Wyatt tries to sabotage Psychomech to kill Garrison but Garrison uses his supernatural abilities to conquer his fears one by one. Schroeder's essence reveals itself to Garrison while he under Psychomech's influence. Garrison tries to deny Schroeder but allows Schroeder to merge with himself as he realises he can't overcome the final fear, the last obstacle along, Garrison/Schroeder enter the black room which holds Garrison's final fear and finds Terri and Wyatt locked in an embrace. They change revealing all those who have betrayed Garrison. Garrison/Schroeder's supernatural abilities reach their peak. They return sight to Garrison's body then resurrect Vicki, returning her to her original state while curing her eyesight and removing her terminal disease. They punish Terri and Wyatt first with pain and then death. Koenig is rewarded for his loyalty by granting him immortality by merging his consciousness with their own to form Garrison/Schroeder/Koenig. They erase the existence of Psychomech, Wyatt, and his house and then, together, the Garrison/Schroeder/Koenig entity, along with Vicki, are left to a world of untold possibilities.
