= St. Michael's Church (Marblehead, Massachusetts) =

Historic church in Massachusetts, United States

- U.S. National Register of Historic Places
- U.S. Historic district – Contributing property
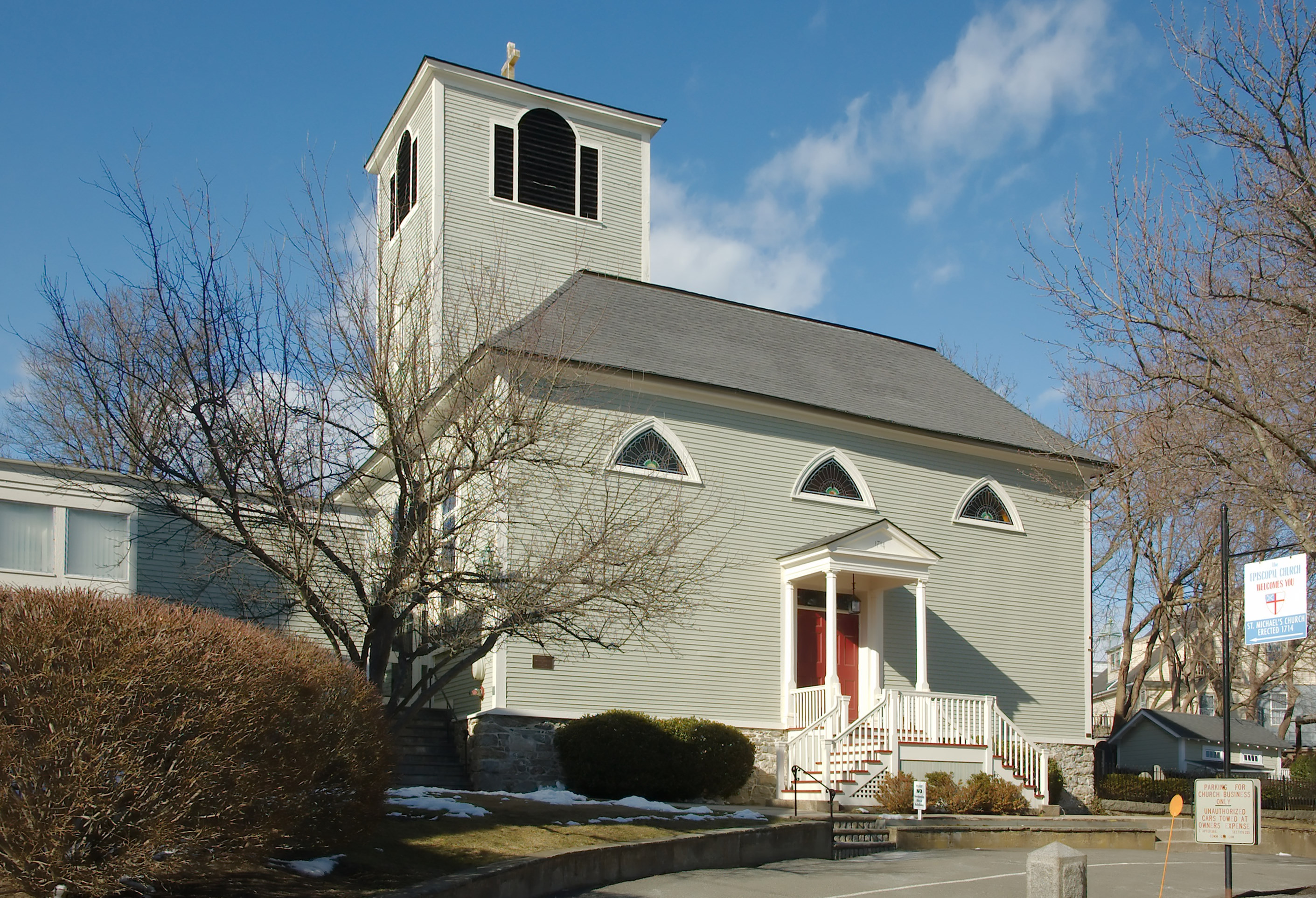
- St. Michael's Church, Marblehead

- Location within Massachusetts Location within the United States
- Location: 26 Pleasant Street, Marblehead, Massachusetts
- Coordinates: 42°30′15″N 70°51′5″W
- Built: 1714
- Architectural style: colonial with gothic revival changes
- Part of: Marblehead Historic District (ID84002402)
- NRHP reference No.: 73000305

Significant dates
- Added to NRHP: June 18, 1973
- Designated CP: January 10, 1984

St. Michael's Church is an historic Episcopal church in Marblehead, Massachusetts. Built in 1714, it is New England's oldest Episcopal church building on its original site. It is currently part of the Episcopal Diocese of Massachusetts. The building was listed on the National Register of Historic Places in 1973.

The church reported 291 members in 2018 and 241 members in 2023; no membership statistics were reported in 2024 parochial reports. Plate and pledge income reported for the congregation in 2024 was $229,722 with average Sunday attendance (ASA) of 52 persons.

== Description and history ==
St. Michael's is set on a property that primarily faces Summer Street to the south, even though its address is on Pleasant Street to the north. The church building was constructed in 1714, originally as a parish church of the Church of England, and twenty-nine of the original thirty-three donors were sea captains. The Society for the Propagation of the Gospel in Foreign Parts provided the church with its first rector. The original square church had a similar architectural style in layout and roof design to the Nieuwe Kerk Church (Haarlem) in the Netherlands. The church was expanded in 1728. During the American Revolutionary War in 1776 a mob of patriots raided the church and removed the British royal coat of arms from the building. Many of St. Michael's members were Loyalists who fled to Canada during the Revolution.

In 1793 the original spire on the bell tower was taken down due to 'being rotten.' The building was renovated in 1833 with Gothic windows, new pews and with the altar, a pulpit and original reredos at the north end. Stained glass windows by Redding & Baird were installed in the Gothic windows in 1888. The windows over the south entrance were added later. The church building was added to the National Register of Historic Places in 1973. In the 1980s, residing activity uncovered some of the original window configuration, and archaeological activity was done in its crypt area to study 18th-century burial practices. In August 2014 a spire was added back to the bell tower as part of the church's 300th anniversary celebration.

Church as it appeared with original roof style and steeple

St. Michael's Church sketch from 1763 by Ashley Bowen showing original steeple

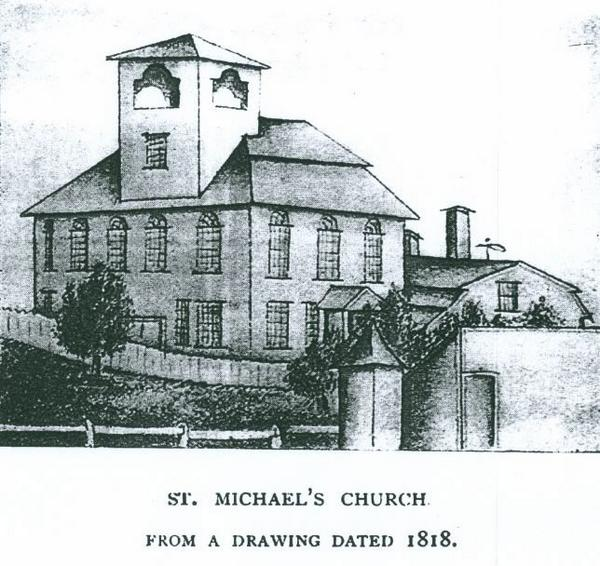
St. Michael's Church in 1818 showing original window arrangement

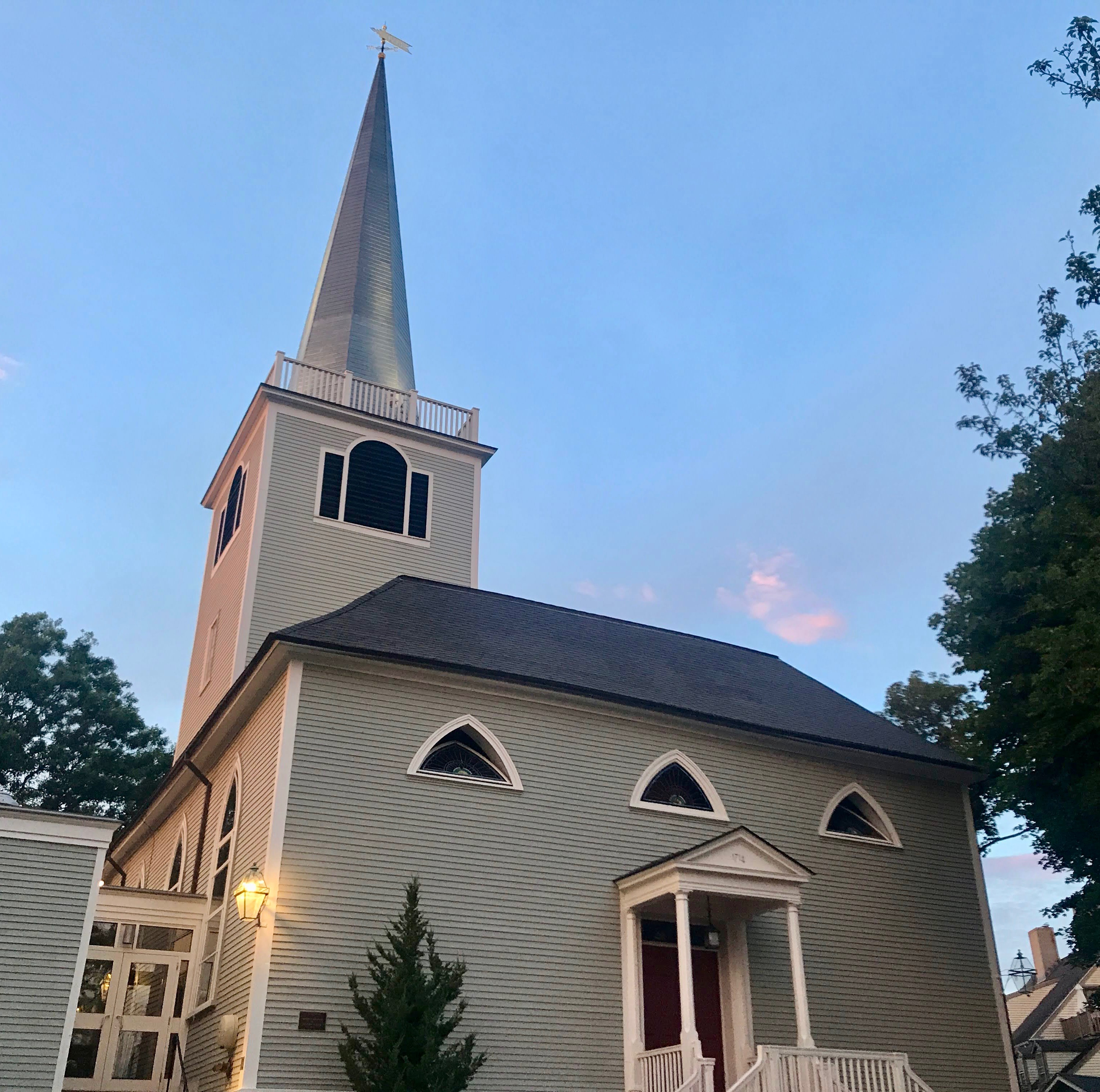
St. Michael's Church after Steeple restoration in 2014

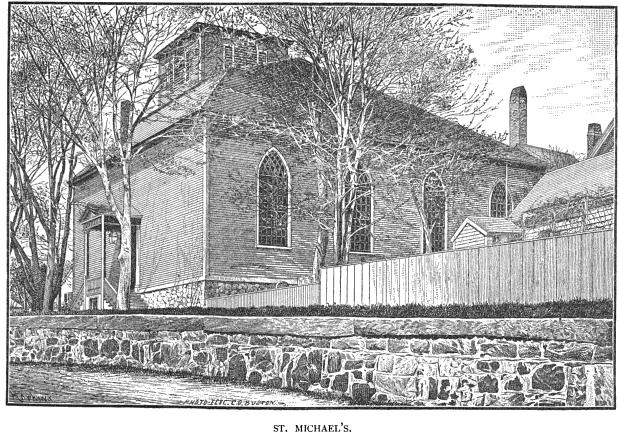
St Michael's

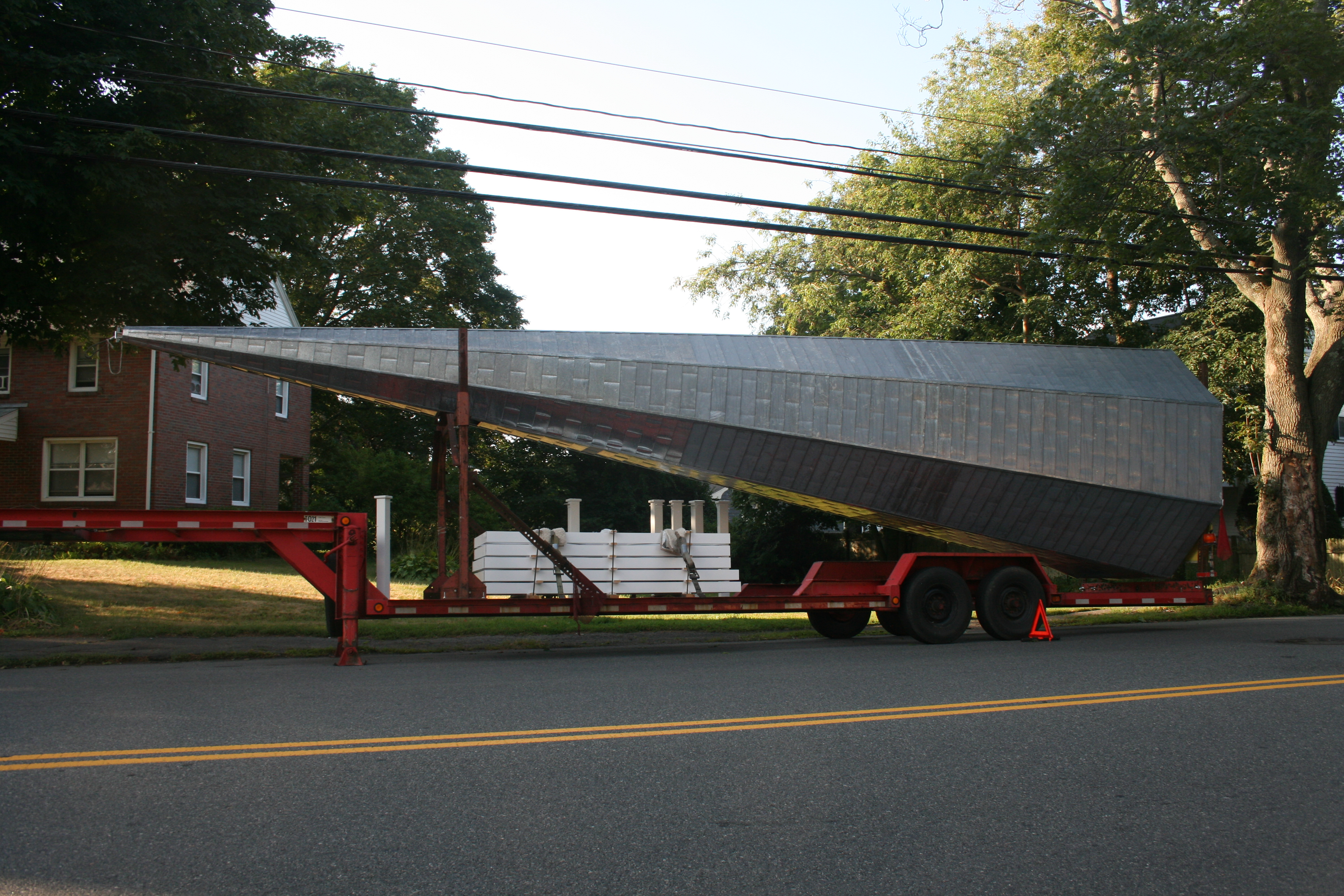
New Steeple awaiting installation

== See also ==
- National Register of Historic Places listings in Essex County, Massachusetts
- List of the oldest buildings in Massachusetts
- "The Festival" is a short story featuring this church and Marblehead, renamed Kingsport, by H. P. Lovecraft written in October 1923 and published in the January 1925 issue of Weird Tales.
