= Necroscope (novel) =

1986 novel by Brian Lumley

- First edition
- Author: Brian Lumley
- Cover artist: Alun Hood
- Language: English
- Series: Necroscope
- Genre: Horror, Science fiction, Adventure
- Publisher: Grafton
- Publication date: 1986
- Publication place: United Kingdom
- Media type: Print (Hardback & Paperback)
- Pages: 512
- ISBN: 0-586-06665-9
- Followed by: Necroscope II: Wamphyri (1988)

Necroscope is the first book in the Necroscope series by British writer Brian Lumley. It was released in 1986.

== Plot ==
Harry is an English youth in school, and strange things occur as he grows up, such as a sudden increased intellect in mathematics, and the ability to fight beyond his experience after a teacher is killed. Eventually he marries his childhood sweetheart, Brenda, who slowly realizes there is more to her now-successful writer husband: that he can speak to the dead, whose collective consciousnesses remain behind, at the location of dying.

These dead can talk only to Harry at first, but eventually, they can "deadspeak" to each other. Coinciding with Harry's evolving abilities, Boris Dragosani is contacted by a long-chained vampire, Thibor Ferenczy. Boris gains the ability to become a necromancer, who can forcefully extract secrets from the dead by playing with their remains and even eating them.

Harry goes to visit his stepfather, who he knows killed his mother by drowning her in a river, and lives in a house at that river. Harry, realizing his stepfather is a Russian spy who plans to kill him for his talents, sabotages his stepfather, but both crash through the ice and fall into the frozen river. As he tries to get out, Harry discovers a new ability of the dead when his mother's corpse drags his stepfather down into the cold river, drowning him also.

Eventually, Harry is contacted by E-Branch, who deal with "ESPionage" using psychic investigators and spies, while Boris is hired by the U.S.S.R. equivalent, the Opposition. Boris tracks down rumors of vampires, finding a World War 2 veteran who killed one, Faethor Ferenczy, along with a Russian Mongul, Max Batu, whose talent is to kill someone just by looking into their eyes. Eventually, Thibor manipulates Dragosani and reveals that he is in a symbiotic relationship with a vampire, and they can reproduce but once per lifetime. He gives his offspring to Boris, who later betrays and kills Thibor with Batu, and in turn kills Batu so he can gain the secrets of using the "Evil Eye".

Meanwhile, the head of E-Branch, who was killed by Boris, requests Harry's help in defeating the necromancer. Harry uses his ability to talk to the mathematician Mobius, who teaches him to travel in time (and later space) by using the "Mobius continuum". Harry uses "doors" to leap from place to place, and goes (teleports) to Russia where Boris is now the head of Russia's ESPionage unit, having killed the former leader. Using an army of undead, he eventually finds Boris, who tries to use his newly acquired "evil eye" to kill Harry. However, one of Harry's undead followers interposes himself between the two, and Dragosani is killed because, as Max Batu had told him earlier, "one cannot curse the dead, for the dead cannot die twice." Unfortunately, Harry himself dies in the conflict from gunshot wounds, but his mind also lives on like his dead friends'; his body survives long enough to draw Dragosani back into the Mobius Continuum and trap him in a recurring time loop for all eternity.
