= The Picture in the House =

Short story by H. P. Lovecraft

- Short story by H. P. Lovecraft

Text available at Wikisource
- Country: United States
- Language: English
- Genre: Horror

Publication
- Published in: The National Amateur
- Publication type: Periodical
- Media type: Print (magazine)
- Publication date: Summer 1921

"The Picture in the House" is a short story written by H. P. Lovecraft. It was written on December 12, 1920, and first published in the July issue of The National Amateur—which was published in the summer of 1921. It was reprinted in Weird Tales in 1923 and again in 1937.

== Plot ==
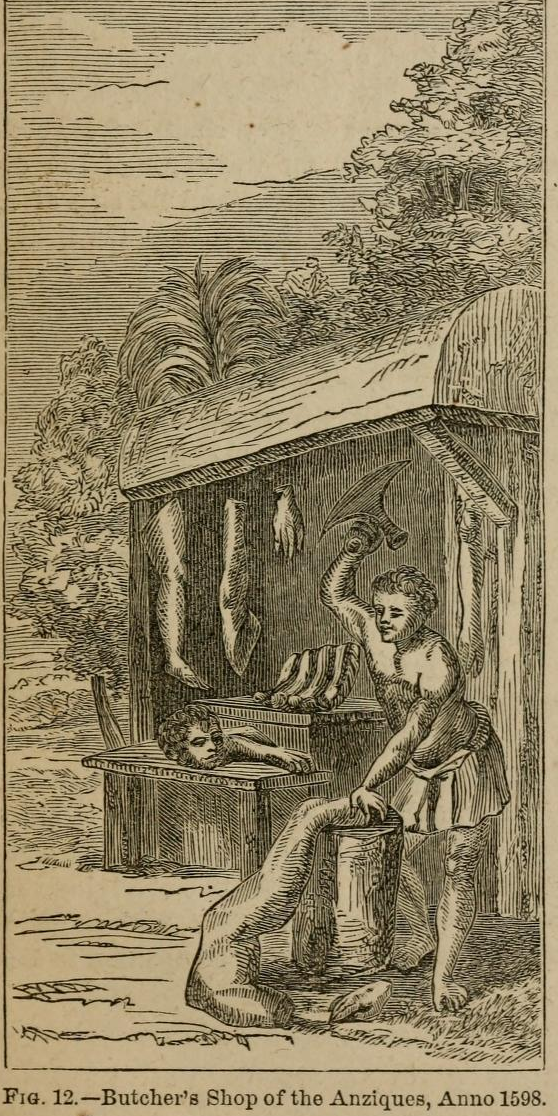
Illustration accompanying Regnum Congo of an "African butcher's shop" with human meat on display.

While riding his bicycle in the Miskatonic Valley of rural New England, a genealogist seeks shelter from an approaching storm in an apparently abandoned house, only to find it contains antique books, exotic artifacts, and furniture predating the American Revolution. He learns that the house is occupied by a "loathsome old, white-bearded, and ragged man", speaking in "an extreme form of Yankee dialect... thought long extinct." At first, the old man appears harmless and ignorant towards his guest. However, he shows a disquieting fascination for an engraving in a rare old book, Regnum Congo, and admits to the narrator how it made him hunger for "victuals I couldn't raise nor buy" – presumably human flesh. It is suggested that the old man was murdering travelers who stumbled upon the house to satisfy his "craving", and has extended his own life preternaturally through cannibalism. A now-frightened narrator realizes the old man has been alive for over a century. Still, the old man denies he ever acted upon such a desire. Suddenly, a drop of blood falls from the ceiling, clearly coming from the floor above, and splashes a page in the book. The narrator then looks up to see a spreading red stain on the ceiling; this belies the old man's statement. At that moment, a bolt of lightning destroys the house. Fortunately, the narrator survives to tell of his ordeal.

== Lovecraft Country ==
"The Picture in the House" begins with something of a manifesto for the series of horror stories Lovecraft would write set in an imaginary New England countryside that would come to be known as Lovecraft Country:

Searchers after horror haunt strange, far places. For them are the catacombs of Ptolemais, and the carven mausoleums of the nightmare countries. They climb to the moonlit towers of ruined Rhine castles, and falter down black cobwebbed steps beneath the scattered stones of forgotten cities in Asia. The haunted wood and the desolate mountain are their shrines, and they linger around the sinister monoliths on uninhabited islands. But the true epicure of the terrible, to whom a new thrill of unutterable ghastliness is the chief end and justification of existence, esteem most of all the ancient, lonely farmhouses of backwoods New England; for there the dark elements of strength, solitude, grotesqueness, and ignorance combine to form the perfection of the hideous.

As Lovecraft critic Peter Cannon writes, "Here Lovecraft serves notice that he will rely less on stock Gothic trappings and more on his native region as a source for horror." Lovecraft's analysis of the psychological roots of New England horror is echoed in his discussion of Nathaniel Hawthorne in the essay "Supernatural Horror in Literature".

The story introduces two of Lovecraft Country's most famous elements:

I had been travelling for some time amongst the people of the Miskatonic Valley in quest of certain genealogical data.... Now I found myself upon an apparently abandoned road which I had chosen as the shortest cut to Arkham.

Neither location is further developed in this tale, but Lovecraft had placed the foundations for one of the most enduring settings in weird fiction.

== Inspiration ==
The ending of the story, in which the narrator is saved by a thunderbolt that destroys the ancient house, may have been inspired by the similar ending of Edgar Allan Poe's "The Fall of the House of Usher".

Critic Jason Eckhardt suggested that the dialect the unnaturally aged man uses in the story is derived from one used in James Russell Lowell's Biglow Papers (1848). Even in Lowell's time, the dialect was thought to be long extinct. Scott Connors has stated that "the use of an archaic dialect in "The Picture in the House"...represents an early example of (the notion of plunging through time), transforming what might otherwise be a mundane tale of cannibalism into a meditation on the paradoxes of time."

Peter Cannon has pointed to parallels between "The Picture in the House" and Arthur Conan Doyle's "The Adventure of the Copper Beeches".

== Connections ==
A phrase from the story's opening paragraph provided the title for An Epicure of the Terrible: A Centennial Anthology of Essays in Honor of H. P. Lovecraft, edited by S. T. Joshi.

== Reception ==
Colin Wilson called the story "a nearly convincing sketch of sadism". In a 1986 discussion of Lovecraft's work, Joanna Russ dismissed "The Picture in the House" as "one of the flatter stories". Peter H. Cannon considers the story "rooted in authentic Puritan psychohistory." and regards the climax, with the blood dripping from the ceiling above, as demonstrating "a finesse unknown to present-day horror writers who delight in graphic violence." For Cannon, the careful realism and subtle plot development leading up to the denouement involve a restraint which helps make the story "however conventional its cannibal theme, the strongest of Lovecraft's early New England tales." Donald R. Burleson's 1983 study of Lovecraft's work adjudges "The Picture in the House" as demonstrating that "as early as 1920 Lovecraft was capable of weaving a powerful tale of horror – capable of evoking and sustaining mood through highly artful use of language, capable of exercising control of focus in handling his characters, and capable of using his native New England as a locale for horrors as potent as those to be entertained in more conventional settings."

== Adaptations ==
- "The Picture in the House", along with "The Dunwich Horror" and "The Festival", were adapted into short claymation films, and released by Toei Animation as a DVD compilation called H. P. Lovecraft's The Dunwich Horror and Other Stories (H・P・ラヴクラフトのダニッチ・ホラー その他の物語, Ecchi Pī Ravukurafuto no Danicchi Horā Sonota no Monogatari) in August 2007.
- The podcast anthology series 19 Nocturne Boulevard produced a loose audio drama adaptation of "The Picture in the House" in 2009, as adapted by Julie Hoverson.

== Sources ==
- Lovecraft, Howard P. (1984) [1920]. "The Picture in the House". In S. T. Joshi; Peter Cannon (eds.). The Dunwich Horror and Others (9th corrected printing ed.). Sauk City, WI: Arkham House. ISBN 0-87054-037-8. Definitive version.
- Lovecraft, Howard P. (1999) [1920]. "The Picture in the House". In S. T. Joshi (ed.). More Annotated Lovecraft (1st ed.). New York City, NY: Dell. ISBN 0-440-50875-4. With explanatory footnotes.
- Weinreich, Spencer J., "The Book in the House: The Regnum Congo and H. P. Lovecraft's ‘The Picture in the House’", Gothic Studies, Volume 20 Issue 1-2, pp. 59–76, ISSN 1362-7937 (https://doi.org/10.7227/GS.0035)
