= Titus Crow =

- First appearance: Billy's Oak
- Last appearance: Elysia
- Created by: Brian Lumley

In-universe information
- Species: Human
- Gender: Male
- Occupation: Occult Investigator; Psychic Sleuth
- Spouse: Tiania
- Nationality: British
- Birth: 2 December 1916

Titus Crow is the main character in the eponymous series of horror fiction books by Brian Lumley. The books are based on H. P. Lovecraft's Cthulhu Mythos.

== Description ==
In a departure from many Cthulhu Mythos stories, Lumley's characters are not helpless victims of unimaginable forces which can drive humans mad by merely manifesting themselves. Instead, Titus Crow, his friend Henri-Laurent de Marigny, and other Lumley characters confront Cthulhu's minions in a series of increasingly large-scale encounters, in which humans, although outmatched, try to fight back. In a letter to the journal Crypt of Cthulhu, Lumley wrote:

I have trouble relating to people who faint at the hint of a bad smell. A meep or glibber doesn't cut it with me. (I love meeps and glibbers, don't get me wrong, but I go looking for what made them!) That's the main difference between my stories...and HPL's. My guys fight back. Also, they like to have a laugh along the way.

Crow has been known to survive any number of encounters with monsters, although he may not always be able to defeat the creatures. For instance, he may fall unconscious upon running into a monster that kills anything that moves.

In The Transition of Titus Crow, Crow is almost totally destroyed when the Clock crashes while fleeing from the Hounds of Tindalos. (Pt.4 -Fragments). He is slowly recreated from surviving cells & his memories stored in the Clock, as a cyborg over many decades, by a robot who theorized that robots were originally created by organic beings. As a cyborg he now has powers that can better deal with the monsters of the mythos.

He is described as a man who spends most of his money on commodities and keeps the rest of it in the bank. Crow owns several Cthulhu Mythos objects, including the Clock of Dreams. The Clock is a time-space machine in the form of a coffin-shaped clock. It was previously owned by Randolph Carter and by de Marigny's father, and is referred to as "de Marigny's clock" in many of the early short stories.

== Inspiration ==
In an interview with Lumley, Robert M. Price suggests various possible models for Crow, including Miro Hetzel, Jack Vance's futuristic detective, Doctor Who, Mervyn Peake's Titus Groan, August Derleth's Dr. Laban Shrewsbury, William Hope Hodgson's Carnacki and Seabury Quinn's Jules de Grandin. Lumley doesn't acknowledge any of these as conscious inspirations, saying that Crow's time-clock (which derives from Lovecraft's "Through the Gates of the Silver Key") long predates Who; that he's never read Peake's Gormenghast and that the similarity of names is coincidental; and that he "was never too keen on" Derleth's Shrewsbury. He does admit, however, to having "always had a soft spot" for Bram Stoker's Abraham Van Helsing.

== Bibliography ==
=== Novels ===
- The Burrowers Beneath (1974, ISBN 0-312-86867-7)
- The Transition of Titus Crow (1975, ISBN 0-312-86299-7)
- The Clock of Dreams (1978, ISBN 0-312-86868-5)
- Spawn of the Winds (1978, ISBN 0-515-04571-3)
- In the Moons of Borea (1979, ISBN 0-312-86866-9)
- Elysia (1989, ISBN 0-932445-32-2), in which the characters of the Titus Crow series meet characters from Lumley's two other series, Dreamlands and Primal Land, for a grand confrontation with the Dark Forces.

=== Short stories ===
Collected in The Compleat Crow (1987 Hodder and Stoughton). (ISBN 0-340-69544-7)

- "Inception" (1987)
- "Lord of the Worms" (originally published in Weirdbook 17, 1983)
- "The Caller of the Black" (originally published in The Caller of the Black, 1971 Arkham House)
- "The Viking's Stone" (originally published in The Horror at Oakdeene & Others, 1977 Arkham House)
- "The Mirror of Nitocris" (originally published in The Caller of the Black, 1971 Arkham House)
- "An Item of Supporting Evidence" (originally published in Arkham Collector, Winter 1970)
- "Billy's Oak" (originally published in Arkham Collector, Winter 1970)
- "Darghud's Doll" (originally published in The Horror at Oakdeene & Others, 1977 Arkham House)
- "De Marigny's Clock" (originally published in The Caller of the Black, 1971 Arkham House)
- "Name and Number" (originally published in Kadath, July 1982)
- "The Black Recalled" (1983, originally published in World Fantasy Convention 1983: Sixty Years of Weird Tales)
