= Necroscope III: The Source =

- First edition (UK)
- Author: Brian Lumley
- Cover artist: George Underwood
- Language: English
- Series: Necroscope series
- Genre: Horror, Science fiction, Adventure
- Publisher: Grafton Books (UK)
- Publication date: 1989
- Publication place: United Kingdom
- Media type: Print (Hardback & Paperback)
- Preceded by: Necroscope II: Wamphyri (1988)
- Followed by: Necroscope IV: Deadspeak (1990)

Necroscope III: The Source is the third book in the Necroscope series by British writer Brian Lumley. It was released in 1989.

== Plot ==
The series starts to explore the origins of the Wamphyri manifestation on Earth. Years after Harry's son left, Harry has left E-Branch and has spent years searching the world for them. The new head of E-Branch, Darcy Clarke, recruits him in a case of a British spy (Micheal Jazz Simmons) who similarly disappeared, while investigating a Russian base.

On investigation Harry discovers the Base is the result of a "blowback" from a high powered photon beam into an atomic pile which powered it and has created a "Grey hole" in space time, a one-way passage to another world which the Russians have been sending people through, and which monsters have emerged from.

Traveling through a parallel grey hole in Romania Harry enters the source world of the Vampires, a world known as Starside/Sunside, wherein Vampire overlords prey on gypsy inhabitants, and wherein his now adult son (his son having used time travel as well as interdimensional to avoid Harry) is infected as a Vampire/Werewolf and besieged by the world's Vampire Masters as he seeks desperately to protect both himself and the world's people without losing what remains of his own humanity in the process.

Harry and Harry Jr use the sun to destroy the Vampire lords. In the process Harry Jr is horribly wounded by the sun. Harry Sr. spends time with the only vampire Lord that was not banished to the Icelands, Lady Karen. She is struggling with her remaining humanity. Harry cages her in a room in her castle after destroying or freeing all her servants. After starving her for many days he is able to lure out her Vampire leech and kills it. The Lady Karen commits suicide, because she has known what it's like to be Wamphyri. The book leaves off with Harry Jr. becoming aware of Harry Sr. watching him with his mind blocked off from his powers.
