= Necroscope V: Deadspawn =

1991 novel by Brian Lumley

- First edition (UK)
- Author: Brian Lumley
- Cover artist: George Underwood
- Language: English
- Series: Necroscope series
- Genre: Horror, Science fiction, Adventure
- Publisher: Grafton Books (UK); Tor Books (US)
- Publication date: 1991
- Publication place: United Kingdom
- Media type: Print (Hardback & Paperback)
- Preceded by: Necroscope IV: Deadspeak (1990)
- Followed by: Blood Brothers (1992)

Necroscope V: Deadspawn is the fifth book in the Necroscope series by British writer Brian Lumley, and is the last book in the original Necroscope Series. It was released in 1991.

== Plot ==
Harry Keogh discovers that he is being transformed into a member of the Wamphyri by the spores of the mushrooms he inhaled at the ruins of Faethor's house in Ploesti. Additionally he experiments with Janos Ferenczy's "resurrection" necromancy to restore some people – notably Trevor Jordan and Penny Sanderson – to life. E branch begins to suspect Harry may have been infected, but Darcy calls Harry in anyway on a serial killer case.

Resolved to do one last favor for humanity, both the living and the dead, Harry hunts down and deals with the necromancer, serial killer, and rapist Johnny Found.

Shortly after this Harry and Penny, who slept with him while he was literally asleep and thus infected herself, are driven from England by E branch, who cannot risk Harry being allowed to live as a vampire. Eventually Harry and Penny flee for starside, but in the process Penny is killed.

Arriving back in the Vampire world Harry finds Lady Karen alive, after he had thought her dead from an attempted cure. The two out of loneliness become lovers for a time. But the vampire lord Shaithis, banished after battle with Harry and Harry Jr to the icelands, is returning at the head of a small but vicious army, alongside his ancestor from time immemorial, the most feared Wamphyri of all time, Shaitan himself.

Unfortunately Harry Jr, has now mostly devolved into a wolf similar to the one who transmitted its egg to him. Gone are most of his powers, leaving his father and Karen to face Shaitan and Shaithis almost alone.

Harry and Karen are, after a brief battle, crucified at the gate. However, in a last act Karen commits suicide to take Shaithis with her and Harry and Harry Jr combine their powers one last time to send a plea for help to earth. While Harry Jr is killed by Shaithis' minions, the plea results in the dead in the Russian complex sending a nuclear armed exorcet through the gate destroying Shaitan along with all vampire thralls in a nuclear explosion. Moments before the explosion Harry's mind is contacted by the entity representing the Möbius Continuum, carrying Harry's mind away. His mutilated corpse is sent back in time closing the loop that leads to Shaitan's transformation into Whampyri thousands of years before the current events.
