= Boma Kingdom =

Historical polity in the Congo Basin

- c. 1600–c. 1900
- Capital: Mbali
- Ngeliboma
- History
  - Established: c. 1600
  - Disestablished: c. 1900
Preceded by	Succeeded by
Mwene Muji	Congo Free State

The Boma Kingdom, Ibar, or Giribuma was a polity in the Congo Basin of the Boma people, around Lake Mai-Ndombe. It split from Mwene Muji in the early-17th century, with tradition holding its founder as Maluma Bieme. It maintained close relations with the Tio Kingdom. In the 1640s, the Boma Kingdom was said to control fifteen "kings" and to be one of the "mightiest kingdoms in Africa". By the end of the 19th century, Boma surpassed Mwene Muji to become the major power in the Lower Kasai region.

According to tradition, the Ngeliboma (Boma king) was elected by the spirits. The Ngeliboma embodied divine virtues and surrounded himself with a royal court. He had to be a mage to become the chief of the community, however he could not remove any village chiefs. Villages north of Lake Mai-Ndombe were run by councils of elders. The Ngeli became the dominant class of the kingdom. They could only marry the Nkumu class, also located in the elite of the kingdom. Free men could also marry the Nkumu, but never the Ngeli. They traded ivory, wood and slaves.

Boma oral traditions, collected in 1926, detail how the Boma people have come to inhabit the region, following a group of leaders south down the Kwango River to escape their elders forcing them to work in mines. They settled in three waves, creating subdivisions in the group. The tale then goes on to detail the conquest of the region by the Ngeli, one of the elders they had fled from, thus giving the leaders of the Boma Kingdom, ngeliboma, legitimacy by being elders of the original founders, the Ntote of Mwene Muji.
