= The Caller of the Black =

- Dust-jacket illustration by Herb Arnold.
- Author: Brian Lumley
- Cover artist: Herb Arnold
- Language: English
- Genre: Fantasy, horror
- Publisher: Arkham House
- Publication date: 1971
- Publication place: United States
- Media type: Print (hardback)
- Pages: 235

The Caller of the Black is a collection of stories by British writer Brian Lumley. It was released in 1971 and was the author's first collection of stories published by Arkham House. It was published in an edition of 3,606 copies. Many of the stories are of the Cthulhu Mythos.

== Contents ==
The Caller of the Black contains the following stories:

- "A Thing About Cars!"
- "The Cyprus Shell"
- "Billy's Oak"
- "The Writer in the Garret"
- "The Caller of the Black"
- "The Mirror of Nitocris"
- "The Night Sea Maid Went Down"
- "The Thing from the Blasted Heath"
- "An Item of Supporting Evidence"
- "Dylath-Leen"
- "De Marigny's Clock"
- "Ambler's Inspiration"
- "In the Vaults Beneath"
- "The Pearl"

== Sources ==
- Jaffery, Sheldon (1989). The Arkham House Companion. Mercer Island, WA: Starmont House, Inc. pp. 101–102. ISBN 1-55742-005-X.
- Chalker, Jack L.; Mark Owings (1998). The Science-Fantasy Publishers: A Bibliographic History, 1923-1998. Westminster, MD and Baltimore: Mirage Press, Ltd. p. 46.
- Joshi, S.T. (1999). Sixty Years of Arkham House: A History and Bibliography. Sauk City, WI: Arkham House. p. 128. ISBN 0-87054-176-5.
- Nielsen, Leon (2004). Arkham House Books: A Collector's Guide. Jefferson, NC and London: McFarland & Company, Inc. pp. 115–116. ISBN 0-7864-1785-4.
