= The Horror at Oakdeene and Others =

Collection of stories by Brian Lumley published in 1977

- Dust-jacket illustration by Stephen E. Fabian for The Horror at Oakdeene and Others
- Author: Brian Lumley
- Cover artist: Stephen E. Fabian
- Language: English
- Genre: Fantasy, horror
- Publisher: Arkham House
- Publication date: 1977
- Publication place: United States
- Media type: Print (hardback)
- Pages: 229 pp
- ISBN: 0-87054-078-5
- OCLC: 3169341
- Dewey Decimal: 823/.9/14
- LC Class: PZ4.L9575 Ho3 PR6062.U45

The Horror at Oakdeene and Others is a collection of stories by author Brian Lumley. It was released in 1977 and was the author's third book published by Arkham House. It was published in an edition of 4,162 copies. Many of the stories are of the Cthulhu Mythos.

== Contents ==
The Horror at Oakdeene and Others contains the following stories:

- "The Viking's Stone"
- "Aunt Hester"
- "No Way Home"
- "The Horror at Oakdeene"
- "The Cleaner Woman"
- "The Statement of Henry Worthy"
- "Darghud's Doll"
- "Born of the Winds"

== Sources ==
- Jaffery, Sheldon (1989). The Arkham House Companion. Mercer Island, WA: Starmont House, Inc. pp. 117–118. ISBN 1-55742-005-X.
- Chalker, Jack L.; Mark Owings (1998). The Science-Fantasy Publishers: A Bibliographic History, 1923-1998. Westminster, MD and Baltimore: Mirage Press, Ltd. p. 52.
- Joshi, S.T. (1999). Sixty Years of Arkham House: A History and Bibliography. Sauk City, WI: Arkham House. pp. 141–142. ISBN 0-87054-176-5.
- Nielsen, Leon (2004). Arkham House Books: A Collector's Guide. Jefferson, NC and London: McFarland & Company, Inc. p. 123. ISBN 0-7864-1785-4.
