= Boma people =

Ethnic group in the DRC

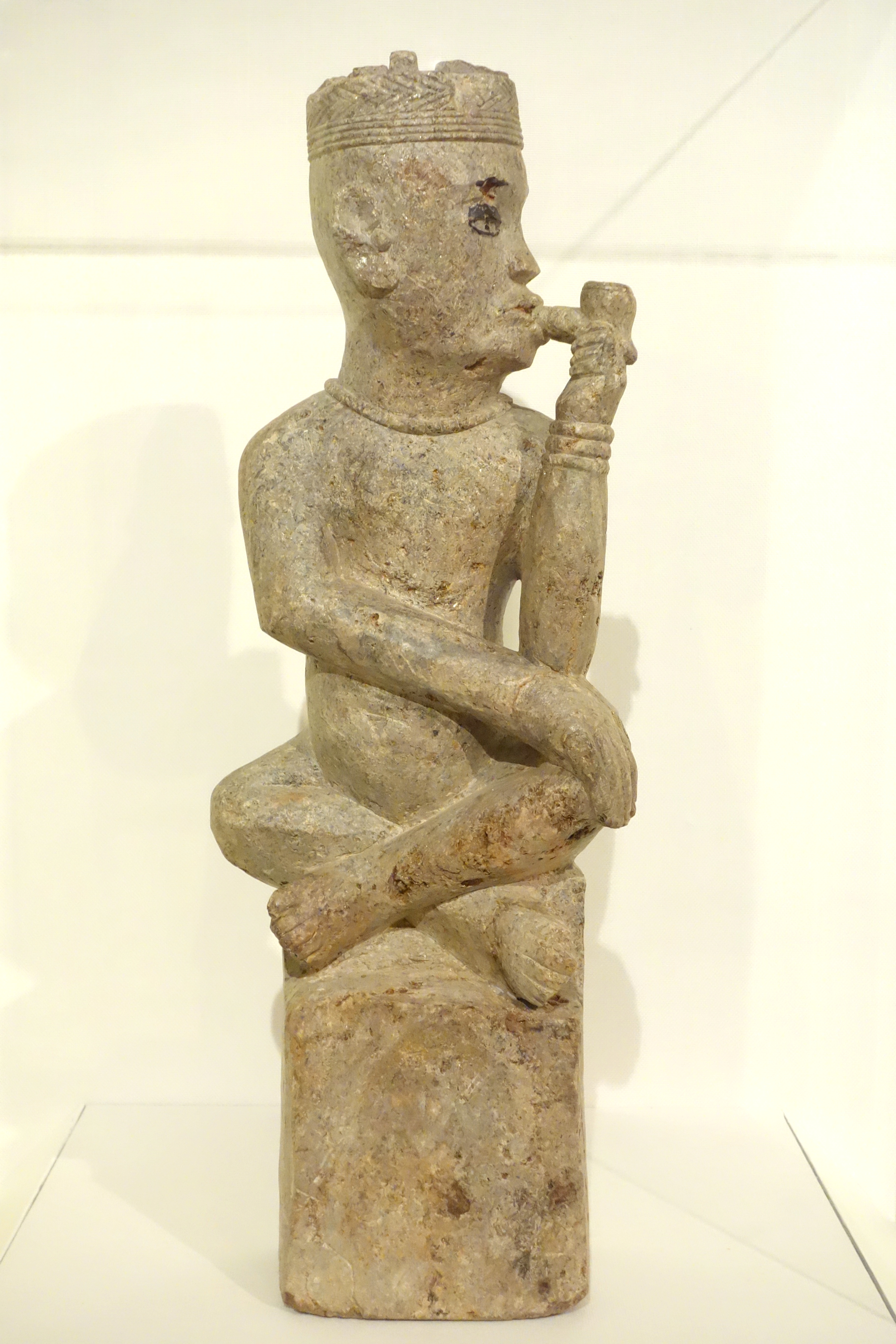
Boma grave marker of the chief smoking, c. 19th century

The Boma people (Note: Other names include: Baboma, Bama, Bamboma, BaMboma, Bavelele, Bomas, Buma, Mboma, and Wabuma.) are a Bantu ethnic group in the Democratic Republic of the Congo. They speak the Boma language. The Boma people are mainly found across the banks of the lower Kasai and Lukenié rivers in the Democratic Republic of the Congo. The total number of native speakers varies with each source, however most estimations point to 38,000 speakers.

== History ==
The Boma people formed the Boma Kingdom in 17th century, which endured until Belgian colonial conquest.

== Distribution ==
The Boma Nku inhabit the south, in the region of Kasai, mostly, in the middle stretch of the Kasai River. On the other hand, the Boma Ngeli in the north live in the region of Mushie. They both come from the lands surrounds the upper reaches of the Lukenié River.
