= Brian Lumley =

English horror fiction writer (1937–2024)

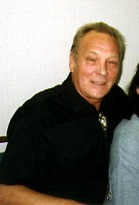
- Lumley in 2011
- Born: 2 December 1937; County Durham, England
- Died: 2 January 2024 (aged 86)
- Occupations: Novelist, writer
- Writing career
- Period: 1971–2024
- Genres: Horror, science fiction
- Notable work: Necroscope series
- Website: brianlumley.com

Brian Lumley (2 December 1937 – 2 January 2024) was an English author of horror fiction. He came to prominence in the 1970s writing in the Cthulhu Mythos created by American writer H. P. Lovecraft but featuring the new character Titus Crow. He went on to greater fame in the 1980s with the best-selling Necroscope series, initially centered on character Harry Keogh, who can communicate with the spirits of the dead.

== Biography ==
Born in County Durham, he joined the British Army's Royal Military Police and wrote stories in his spare time before retiring with the rank of Warrant Officer Class 1 in 1980 and becoming a professional writer.

While searching for books written by H. P. Lovecraft, Lumley contacted Lovecraft's publisher August Derleth. After reading some of Lumley's stories, Derleth invited him to contribute to Tales of the Cthulhu Mythos. He added to the Cthulhu Mythos cycle of stories, including several tales and a novel featuring the character Titus Crow. Several of his early books were published by Arkham House. Other stories pastiched Lovecraft's Dream Cycle but featured Lumley's original characters David Hero and Eldin the Wanderer. Lumley once explained the difference between his Cthulhu Mythos characters and Lovecraft's: "My guys fight back. Also, they like to have a laugh along the way."

Later works included the Necroscope series of novels, which produced spin-off series such as the Vampire World Trilogy, The Lost Years parts 1 and 2, and the E-Branch trilogy. The central protagonist of the earlier Necroscope novels appears in the anthology Harry Keogh and Other Weird Heroes. The last entry in the Necroscope saga is The Mobius Murders.

Lumley served as president of the Horror Writers Association from 1996 to 1997. He served as Master of Ceremonies at the World Horror Convention in both 1992 and 1995. In 1998 he was named the Grand Master of Horror and Author of the year at the convention. He received the 2009 Bram Stoker Award for Lifetime Achievement from the Horror Writers Association. He also received a World Fantasy Award for Lifetime Achievement in 2010. His short story Fruiting Bodies won a British Fantasy Award in 1989.

Fans of Necroscope gathered at the annual KeoghCon from 2000 to 2007. They were joined by Lumley and his wife Barbara Ann, known as "Silky". The books have been published in thirteen countries and have sold over three million copies in the US.

Lumley died on 2 January 2024, at the age of 86.

== Inspiration ==
Lumley's list of his favourite horror stories – "not complete by any means and by no means in order of preference" – included M. R. James' "Count Magnus", Robert E. Howard's "The Black Stone", Robert W. Chambers' "The Yellow Sign" from The King in Yellow, William Hope Hodgson's "The Voice in the Night", and H. P. Lovecraft's "The Haunter of the Dark" and "The Colour Out of Space".

== Bibliography ==
This is a list of Lumley's more notable novels and short story collections. This list of novels and short stories is not exhaustive. Lumley had many pieces published in periodicals and other publications, sometimes as works in progress or partial works, under his own name and jointly with other writers.

Title	Series	Year	Pages	Type	Notes
Necroscope	Necroscope Saga	1986	512	novel	
Necroscope II: Wamphyri!	Necroscope Saga	1988	496	novel	US Title: Necroscope II: Vamphyri!
Necroscope III: The Source	Necroscope Saga	1989	528	novel	
Necroscope IV: Deadspeak	Necroscope Saga	1990	560	novel	
Necroscope V: Deadspawn	Necroscope Saga	1991	592	novel	
Vampire World 1: Blood Brothers	Necroscope Saga	1992	752	novel	US Title Blood Brothers
Vampire World 2: The Last Aerie	Necroscope Saga	1993	768	novel	US Title The Last Aerie
Vampire World 3: Bloodwars	Necroscope Saga	1994	784	novel	US Title Bloodwars
Necroscope: The Lost Years Volume 1	Necroscope Saga	1995	483	novel	US Title Necroscope: The Lost Years
Necroscope: The Lost Years Volume 2	Necroscope Saga	1996	468	novel	US Title Necroscope: Resurgence, The Lost Years Volume Two
E-Branch Volume 1: Invaders	Necroscope Saga	1998	560	novel	US Title Necroscope: Invaders
E-Branch Volume 2: Defilers	Necroscope Saga	1999	672	novel	
E-Branch Volume 3: Avengers	Necroscope Saga	2000	576	novel	
Harry Keogh: Necroscope and Other Weird Heroes!	Necroscope Saga	2003	320	collection	
Necroscope: The Touch	Necroscope Saga	2006	672	novel	
Necroscope: Harry and the Pirates	Necroscope Saga	2009	416	collection	UK Title Necroscope: The Lost Years Harry and the Pirates
Necroscope: The Plague-Bearer	Necroscope Saga	2010	184	novella	
Necroscope: The Möbius Murders	Necroscope Saga	2013	176	novella	
Psychomech	Psychomech Trilogy	1984	351	novel	
Psychosphere	Psychomech Trilogy	1984	272	novel	
Psychamok	Psychomech Trilogy	1985	445	novel	
The Burrowers Beneath	Cthulhu Cycle Deities	1974		novel	Part of the Titus Crow series
The Transition of Titus Crow	Cthulhu Cycle Deities	1975		novel	Part of the Titus Crow series
The Clock of Dreams	Cthulhu Cycle Deities	1978		novel	Part of the Titus Crow series
Spawn of the Winds	Cthulhu Cycle Deities	1978		novel	Part of the Titus Crow series
In the Moons of Borea	Cthulhu Cycle Deities	1979		novel	Part of the Titus Crow series
Elysia	Cthulhu Cycle Deities	1989		novel	Book ties together & concludes Titus Crow, Dreamlands and Primal Land series
Hero of Dreams	Cthulhu Cycle Deities	1986		novel	Part of the Dreamlands series
Ship of Dreams	Cthulhu Cycle Deities	1986		novel	Part of the Dreamlands series
Mad Moon of Dreams	Cthulhu Cycle Deities	1987		novel	Part of the Dreamlands series
Iced on Aran	Cthulhu Cycle Deities	1992		collection	Part of the Dreamlands series
House of Cthulhu	Cthulhu Cycle Deities	1991		collection	Part of the Primal Land series
Tarra Khash: Hrossak!	Cthulhu Cycle Deities	1991		novel	Part of the Primal Land series
Sorcery in Shad	Cthulhu Cycle Deities	1991		novel	Part of the Primal Land series
Beneath the Moors	Cthulhu Cycle Deities	1974		novella	
Khai of Ancient Khem		1981		novel	Khai of Khem in recent editions
Demogorgon		1987	345	novel	
The House of Doors		1990		novel	
The House of Doors: The Second Visit		1998		novel	US title: Maze of Worlds
The Fly-By-Nights		2011		novel	
The Caller of the Black		1971		collection	
The Horror at Oakdeene and Others		1977		collection	
The House of Cthulhu and Others		1984		collection	
Fruiting Bodies and Other Fungi		1993		collection	
Dagon's Bell and Other Discords		1994		collection	
Return of the Deep Ones and Other Mythos Tales	Cthulhu Cycle Deities	1994		collection	
The Second Wish and Other Exhalations		1995		collection	
A Coven of Vampires		1998		collection	
The Whisperer and Other Voices		2001		collection	
Brian Lumley's Freaks		2004		collection	
Screaming Science Fiction: Horrors from Out of Space		2006		collection	
The Taint and other Novellas: Best Mythos Tales Number 1	Cthulhu Cycle Deities	2008		collection	
Haggopian and Other Tales: Best Mythos Tales Number 1	Cthulhu Cycle Deities	2008		collection	
The Nonesuch and Others		2009		collection	

The Subterranean Press edition

- Necroscope (novel)
- Brian Lumley's Freaks
  - Introduction
  - In the Glow Zone
  - Mother Love
  - Problem Child
  - The Ugly Act
  - Somebody Calling
- A Coven of Vampires (1998)
  - What Dark God?
  - Back Row
  - The Strange Years
  - The Kiss of the Lamia
  - Recognition
  - The Thief Immortal
  - Necros
  - The Thing from the Blasted Heath
  - Uzzi
  - Haggopian
  - The Picknickers
  - Zack Phalanx is Vlad the Impaler
  - The House of the Temple
- Screaming Science Fiction: Horrors from Out of Space
  - "Snarker's Son"
  - "The Man Who Felt Pain"
  - "The Strange Years"
  - "No Way Home"
  - "The Man Who Saw No Spiders"
  - "Deja Viewer"
  - "Feasibility Study"
  - "Gaddy's Gloves"
  - "The Big 'C'"
- The Taint and other novellas: Best Mythos Tales, Volume One (2007)
  - "Introduction"
  - The Horror at Oakdeene
  - Born of the Winds
  - The Fairground Horror
  - The Taint
  - Rising with Surtsey
  - Lord of the Worms
  - The House of the Temple
- Haggopian and other stories (2008)
  - Introduction
  - The Caller of the Black
  - Haggopian
  - Cement Surroundings
  - The House of Cthulhu
  - The Night Sea-Maid Went Down
  - Name and Number
  - Recognition
  - Curse of the Golden Guardians
  - Aunt Hester
  - The Kiss of Bugg-Shash
  - De Marigny's Clock
  - Mylakhrion the Immortal
  - The Sister City
  - What Dark God?
  - The Statement of Henry Worthy
  - Dagon's Bell
  - The Thing from the Blasted Heath
  - Dylath Leen
  - The Mirror of Nitocris
  - The Second Wish
  - The Hymn
  - Synchronicity or Something
  - The Black Recalled
  - The Sorcerer's Dream
- The Nonesuch and Others (2009)
  - Introduction
  - "The Thin People"
  - "Stilts"
  - The Nonesuch
- The Fly-by-Nights (2011)
