= List of Seraph of the End episodes =

Cover of the first Seraph of the End home media release.

Seraph of the End (Japanese: 終わりのセラフ, Hepburn: Owari no Seraph) is a Japanese anime series based on the manga of the same name, written by Takaya Kagami and illustrated by Yamato Yamamoto, with storyboards by Daisuke Furuya. It is produced by Wit Studio, directed by Daisuke Tokudo, and written by Hiroshi Seko. Kagami drafted the original story for episodes with materials not yet serialized in the manga and supervising the scripts until the anime's final episode. The series is set in a post-apocalyptic world caused a "human-made" virus, killing the world's populace and sparing all children under the age of thirteen. It is at this time that vampires emerge from the recesses of the earth, likely followed by age-old horrors of the dark thought only to be myth. An orphaned boy named Yūichirō Hyakuya joins the human military to avenge his family and save his friend Mikaela from the vampires.

On December 12, 2014, it was announced the series would run in two split cours (quarters of the year). The first one aired in 2015 from April to June and the second one from October to December, with both cours having twelve episodes each. The second cour entitled Seraph of the End: Battle in Nagoya (終わりのセラフ 名古屋決戦編, Owari no Serafu: Nagoya Kessen-hen). The series aired on Tokyo MX, MBS, TV Aichi, and BS11 at their respective time slots. NBCUniversal Entertainment Japan released the first cour in Blu-ray and DVD formats in Japan starting on June 24, 2015, across four volumes. A six minute original omake anime series Seraph of the Endless (終わらないセラフ, Owaranai Serafu) was included in each volumes on Blu-ray and DVD.

On March 31, 2015, it was announced that Funimation has licensed the series for streaming and home video release in North America. Hulu has streamed the series that same day. On May 13, 2015, Funimation announced that the English broadcast dub was available on the "Dubble Talk" streaming block. The anime series later aired in the United Kingdom on February 15, 2018.

== Episode list ==
=== Seraph of the End: Vampire Reign (cour one) ===
No. overall	No. in season	Title	Directed by	Original air date
1	1	"The World of Blood Legacy"; Transliteration: "Kechimyaku no Sekai" (Japanese: 血脈のセカイ)	Daisuke Tokudo	April 4, 2015
An unknown virus has killed the world populace, sparing children under the age of thirteen at the mercy of vampires. Yuichiro Hyakuya and his friend Mikaela, spend time at the family orphanage in the vampire capital city of Sanguinem. After a few days being refugees, the children of Hyakuya Orphanage are killed by Ferid Bathory. However, Yu survives the ambush, abandons the city, and meets Guren Ichinose.
2	2	"Humanity After the Fall"; Transliteration: "Hametsu-go no Ningen" (Japanese: 破滅後のニンゲン)	Masashi Koizuka	April 11, 2015
Four years later, Yu joins the Japanese Imperial Demon Army, but is eager to become a member of the Moon Demon Company, a special vampire hunting force led by Guren. Yu meets Shinoa Hiragi and Yoichi Saotome. When the evacuation occurs and a female vampire attacks the school, Guren kills her after Yu holds her off. To fulfill the requirement, Shinoa invites Yu and Yoichi for recruitment training.
3	3	"The Demon in Your Heart"; Transliteration: "Kokoro ni Sumu Oni" (Japanese: 心に棲むオニ)	Tomokazu Tokoro	April 18, 2015
Shinoa is aware that Yu wanted the power. She spars and intimidates him with her Cursed Gear Shikama Dōji. Yu, Shinoa, and Yoichi discover Yuji possessed by a demon at the underground chamber. After disarming it, Yu regains consciousness.
4	4	"Vampire Mikaela"; Transliteration: "Kyūketsuki Mikaera" (Japanese: 吸血鬼ミカエラ)	Junichi Takaoka	April 25, 2015
Mika is shown to be alive in the aftermath, because Krul Tepes saved him by having him drink her blood. Yu and Yoichi meet Shiho Kimizuki at the classroom held by Sayuri Hanayori. A week before an aptitude test, Guren informs Shihō about his sister Mirai, staying at the hospital. Yu and Shiho work together to fight the giant demon puppets. The test ends when Shiho visits Mirai. Although their scores are highly affected due to their absence, Shiho thanks Yu for their concern.
5	5	"Black Demon's Contract"; Transliteration: "Kuro-oni tono Keiyaku" (Japanese: 黒鬼とのケイヤク)	Shuhei Matsushita	May 2, 2015
Krul assembles the vampires and declares war against humanity. Meanwhile, Guren requests Yu to arrange a time for selecting a Cursed Gear. After Yu realizes he failed the exam, Guren uses his Cursed Gear named Mahiru-no-Yo to determine which students can withstand them. Yu, Yoichi, and Shiho choose each of their own Cursed Gears without trading.
6	6	"New Family"; Transliteration: "Atarashii kazoku" (Japanese: 新しいカゾク)	Kei Anjiki	May 9, 2015
Yu, Yoichi, and Shihō each confront their respective demons in the embodiment of their loved ones, in order to gain control of their desire. Yu and Shiho obtain their own Cursed Gears, but Yoichi is possessed by his weapon. Yu and Shiho fend Yoichi off, but they hesitate to harm him. When Yu drops the Cursed Gear to leave himself out in the open, Guren saves Yoichi. Yu, Yoichi, and Shihō become official members of the Moon Demon Company.
7	7	"Mitsuba's Squad"; Transliteration: "Mitsuba no Chīmu" (Japanese: 三葉のチーム)	Tetsuya Wakano	May 16, 2015
Yu, Shinoa, Yoichi, and Shiho meet Mitsuba Sangu, a fifth member of the squad. Guren dispatches them on the first mission together to Harajuku, where a little girl is ambushed by a Four Horsemen of John. Despite Mitsuba's warning, Yu saves the girl, while the others are ambushed by three vampires. The squad destroys the Horsemen, forcing the vampires to retreat. Although Mitsuba berates Yu, she recalls about losing her former squad. The girl informs the squad that the vampires are at Omotesando Station.
8	8	"First Extermination"; Transliteration: "Senmetsu no Hajimari" (Japanese: 殲滅のハジマリ)	Masaki Utsunomiya, Hironori Aoyagi	May 23, 2015
Yu and his allies visit the station, populated by orphaned children. According to the girl's advice, they survive the ambush and free the children. In the aftermath, the girl forgives Yu for deceit. Mitsuba congratulates Yu, but withdraws the statement. Yu and his friends meet the vampire nobles Crowley Eusford, Chess Belle, and Horn Skuld, before the trio leave for the front line. Despite knowing what they will oppose, Yu and his allies enter Shinjuku.
9	9	"Vampire Attack"; Transliteration: "Shūgeki no Vanpaiya" (Japanese: 襲撃のヴァンパイア)	Takeshi Ninomiya	May 30, 2015
The squad rescues their corporal Nagai from a group of armed helicopters. Guren finds a group of vampires from a distance. When Ferid reminds Mika about his role, it is revealed in a flashback that the hesitated Mika drinks Krul's blood. While Nagai escorts the squad to the western defensive barrier, Shinoa, Yu, Yoichi, and Shiho receive a pack of curse and enhancing stimulant pills. One of the helicopters destroy the area of the road, causing them to fall into a sewage and separating the squad.
10	10	"Results of the Choice"; Transliteration: "Sentaku no Kekka" (Japanese: 選択のケッカ)	Mastuo Asami	June 6, 2015
Yu and Shinoa escort Nagai to the paramedic camp. While the Moon Demon Company distracts the vampires, Mika attacks Guren. Yu and Shinoa reunite with Yoichi, Shiho, and Mitsuba at the central park, before heading to the western defensive barrier. Shigure Yukimi and Norito Goshi distract Mika, but Ferid prevents Guren from making the final blow. Mika fights with Guren, before reuniting with Yu.
11	11	"Reunion of Childhood Friends"; Transliteration: "Osananajimi no Saikai" (Japanese: 幼馴染のサイカイ)	Kunihiro Mori	June 13, 2015
After seeing Yu hesitating to kill Mika, Ferid lets the two leave the battlefield. Crowley, Chess, Horn, Lacus Welt, and René Simm, arrive to fight other soldiers, while Ferid lures Yu and Guren away from the rest. When Ferid restrains Guren, Yu returns to the battlefield, before losing control of his power. Mika saves Shinoa and she embraces Yu with a last resort, which reverts him normally before falling unconscious. The vampires and humans delay the battle.
12	12	"Everyone's a Sinner"; Transliteration: "Min'na Tsumibito" (Japanese: みんなツミビト)	Toshikazu Yoshizawa	June 20, 2015
Shinoa discusses with Guren about the pills and Yu rests for a week. Mika retains his body as a human and vampire, while Lacus and René notice his past association. Later, Yu learns that Mika is with the vampires in response to an attack led by Kureto and Shinya. Yu promises Mika they will reunite soon. Guren writes a letter to an recipient and Ferid gives a research data to a client.

=== Seraph of the End: Battle in Nagoya (cour two) ===
No. overall	No. in season	Title	Directed by	Original air date
13	1	"Human World"; Transliteration: "Ningen no Sekai" (Japanese: 人間のセカイ)	Tetsuya Wakano	October 10, 2015
Shinoa reminds Guren that he killed her sister Mahiru in order to get his Cursed Gear. Shinoa tells Yu about Mika, Guren becomes Yu's comrade, and Mitsuba receives a promotion. Kureto summons Yu to test his loyalty to the military, due to the suspicion of being a spy. Kureto tortures Yoichi and Shiho, making Yu realize that he is one of the experiments. After declining their offer and being released, Yu tells Guren about Mika. In Sanguinem, Mika notices that he is lacking blood.
14	2	"Complicated Connections"; Transliteration: "Kōsakusuru Kankei" (Japanese: 交錯するカンケイ)	Tetsuo Hirakawa	October 17, 2015
After Yoichi defeats five Four Horsemen of John, Yu confronts his spiritual partner Asuramaru, breaking free from the illusion and asking her to work together. During the Progenitor Council Meeting, Ferid, Mika, and Krul watch the footage. Ferid reminds Krul that she cannot kill him, since she and Mika had the information. Shiho fights with his partner Kiseki-O, but struggles to resist the illusion, and remember how Yu and Mika got along. While the boys learn their skills, the girls learn that their data files were removed.
15	3	"Ambition in the Demon Army"; Transliteration: "Teiki Gun no Yabou" (Japanese: 帝鬼軍のヤボウ)	Fumihiro Ueno	October 24, 2015
Kureto and Mitsuba's sister Aoi receive a letter from the pigeon. While Yu and his allies prepare to join the army, Kureto deploys Guren and the military at Nagoya, before the vampires move to Tokyo for a month. Meanwhile, Mika satisfies his craving for blood by forcing himself onto Krul. She allegedly gives a secret task for him. Guren notices the progress of Yu and Shiho in their training, and tells Shinoa to make preparations for the mission. While Mika accompanies other vampires near Nagoya, Kureto orders a forbidden experiment on Mirai for a test subject.
16	4	"The Moon Demon's Orders"; Transliteration: "Gekki no gourei" (Japanese: 月鬼のゴウレイ)	Yoshiaki Kyogoku	October 31, 2015
Yu and his friends travel to Ebina, avoiding several Four Horsemen of John. As they arrive late, Guren gives his speech and Yu takes the blame for his trouble. He and his friends train with Guren and his subordinates. Despite planning a strategy, they are defeated. When Makoto Narumi comments about the squad lacking teamwork, Guren assigns the combined one for the next mission. The vampires gather stray human children.
17	5	"Livestock Revolt"; Transliteration: "Hangyaku suru kachiku" (Japanese: 反逆するカチク)	Yasuhiro Akamatsu	November 7, 2015
Narumi assigns the squad to find Lucal Wesker. Yoichi kills Lucal's servant Esther Lee far away from the distance. As the squad ambushes Lucal, he fends them off, until they change formation and injure him. Yayoi Endo distracts Lucal, but he kills himself. After Guren kills Mel Stefano, Eita Kusunoki informs him that the soldiers were kidnapped or killed.
18	6	"Sword of Justice"; Transliteration: "Seigi no Tsurugi" (Japanese: 正義のツルギ)	Yoko Kanamori	November 14, 2015
Crowley, Chess, and Horn discuss the plan at Nagoya City Hall, knowing a traitorous vampire is having information from humans. The whole squads regroup, but Guren leaves Aiko Aihara near the fountain. A few soldiers do not reveal the information and kill themselves with poisonous pills. Mika kills Aiko, after she tells the vampires about Higashiyama Park.
19	7	"Shinya and Guren"; Transliteration: "Shinya to Guren" (Japanese: 深夜とグレン)	Kunihiro Mori	November 21, 2015
While the squad saves all hostages and prepare to leave the town hall, Yu confronts Crowley.
20	8	"Demon's Lullaby"; Transliteration: "Oni no komoriuta" (Japanese: 鬼のコモリウタ)	Tetsuya Wakano	November 28, 2015
The rest of the squad leave Guren at the town hall and Mika betrays the vampires. To defy the military, Yu consumes two pills and falls unconscious. Kureto and his army prepare to leave, when the scientists increase the dosage on Mirai.
21	9	"Traitorous Allies"; Transliteration: "Uragiri no Mikata" (Japanese: 裏切りのミカタ)	Yoshiaki Kyogoku	December 5, 2015
Yu finds a golden trumpet containing the power of angels within his subconscious, but Asuramaru prevents this and possesses Yu. After reviving, Yu fights Crowley, but Shiho arrives and knocks Yu unconscious. Mika charges at the highway and escapes with Yu, before the vampires kill Yayoi and Taro Kagiyama, and the remaining soldiers head to Nagoya Airport.
22	10	"Yu and Mika"; Transliteration: "Yū to Mika" (Japanese: 優とミカ)	Shuhei Matsushita	December 12, 2015
Resting at the abandoned store, Yu saves Mika by offering blood to him. Even though Mika believes that humans are using Yu, he trusts him. While heading to the airport, Mika tells Yu that the vampires and humans had used the experiment. Regardless, he asks him to save their friends. The test subject for the experiment has been finalized from the cargo.
23	11	"Arrogant Love"; Transliteration: "Gōman'na ai" (Japanese: 傲慢なアイ)	Yoko Kanamori, Yumi Kawai, Masashi Koizuka	December 19, 2015
The remaining soldiers receive a letter from the military for them to stand by. Narumi believes the company will abort the mission and rescue Guren. Crowley learns from Ferid that Guren is a Namanari, a human half way into becoming a demon and that Mahiru possessed him. Guren leads the vampires to the airport. After Kureto kills Shusaku Iwasaki and Rika Inoue, Yu and Mika arrive in time to save the others. When the battle occurs between humans and vampires, Guren reunites with Yu.
24	12	"Seraph of the End"; Transliteration: "Owari no Serafu" (Japanese: 終わりのセラフ)	Yumi Kawai, Yoshiaki Kyogoku, Tetsuya Wakano, Daisuke Tokudo	December 26, 2015
After many soldiers died, Kureto controls Mirai, emerging from the container, becoming the Fifth Trumpet Abaddon, and going on a rampage. However, Yu uses the golden trumpet within his subconscious, awakens himself as the Second Trumpet, and destroys Abaddon, before falling unconscious. Ferid kills Krul for betraying the vampires, while Yu and his friends abandon the military. Four months later, the Japanese Imperial Demon Army conquers Sanguinem, while the vampires meet Lest Karr. Yu, Mika, Shinoa, Yoichi, Shiho, Mitsuba, and Narumi walk around the beach.

=== Original video animation ===
No.	Title	Original release date
1	"Vampire Shahal"; Transliteration: "Kyūketsuki Shahal" (Japanese: 吸血鬼シャハル)	May 2, 2016
Yu saves a human girl Riko, and kills a hesitating vampire Shahal to end his suffering. Note: Yuki Kaji voiced Shahal in this episode

== Home media ==
=== Japanese release ===
NBCUniversal Entertainment JapanSeraph of the End: Vampire Reign
Vol.	Episodes	Bonus disc	Release date	Ref.
1	1–3	Seraph of the Endless	June 24, 2015	
2	4–6	Seraph of the Endless 2	July 23, 2015	
3	7–9	Seraph of the Endless 3	August 26, 2015	
4	10–12	Seraph of the Endless 4	September 26, 2015	

Seraph of the End: Battle in Nagoya
Vol.	Episodes	Bonus disc	Release date	Ref.
1	13–15	Seraph of the Endless: Nagoya Edition	December 25, 2015	
2	16–18	Seraph of the Endless: Nagoya Edition 2	January 27, 2016	
3	19–21	Seraph of the Endless: Nagoya Edition 3	March 9, 2016	
4	22–24	Seraph of the Endless: Nagoya Edition 4	March 30, 2016	

Blu-ray Box Set
Vol.	Episodes	Bonus disc	Release date	Ref.
1	1–12	Seraph of the Endless 1–4	December 25, 2017	
2	13–24	Seraph of the Endless: Nagoya Edition 1–4	February 28, 2018	

=== English release ===
Funimation
Part	Episodes	Release date	Ref.
1	1–12	May 24, 2016	
2	13–24	September 27, 2016	
Collector's Edition	1-24	September 27, 2016	
Complete	1-24	August 21, 2018	

Universal Pictures UK
Col.	Episodes	Release date	Ref.
1	1–12	May 23, 2016	
2	13–24	December 5, 2016	

Universal Sony
Part	Episodes	Release date	Ref.
1	1–12	January 2, 2016	
2	13–24	December 14, 2016	

== Music ==
Seraph of the End Original Soundtrack

Soundtrack album by Hiroyuki Sawano, Takafumi Wada, Asami Tachibana, Megumi Shiraishi
- Released: July 15, 2015 (OST 1); January 27, 2016 (OST 2)
- Recorded: Studio Sound Valley (Tokyo, Japan)
- Genre: Soundtrack
- Length: 53:54 (OST 1: Disc 1); 56:38 (OST 1: Disc 2); 54:25 (OST 2)
- Label: NBCUniversal Entertainment Japan
- Producers: Hiroyuki Sawano, Takafumi Wada, Asami Tachibana, Megumi Shiraishi, Yasushi Horiguchi

The series' soundtrack was composed by Hiroyuki Sawano, Takafumi Wada, Asami Tachibana, and Megumi Shiraishi. The first soundtrack album was released on July 15, 2015, containing two discs: the first disc contained 14 tracks and the second one contained 19 tracks. A second soundtrack album was released on January 27, 2016, containing 17 tracks.

Sawano produced and composed the opening and ending theme songs in the first cour of the anime series, titled "X.U." and "scaPEGoat", respectively. As part of his vocal song project "SawanoHiroyuki[nZk]", for the first cour, the opening song is performed by SawanoHiroyuki[nZk]:Gemie, while the ending song is performed by SawanoHiroyuki[nZk]:Yosh. Both themes were released in Japan on a CD on May 20, 2015.

In the second cour of the anime series, the opening theme song is "Two souls -towards the truth-" by fripSide and the ending theme song is "Orarion" (オラリオン) by Nagi Yanagi.

=== Track listing ===
All music in the first disc for the soundtrack were composed by Hiroyuki Sawano.

Seraph of the End Original Soundtrack (Disc 1)
No.	Title	Lyrics	Vocals	Length
1.	"X.U. (TV size)"	Benjamin; mpi	Gemie	1:32
2.	"[A]pa-t"	Benjamin; mpi		2:30
3.	"1hundredknight:Y"			5:37
4.	"pfSOTEad1"			3:36
5.	"1hundredknight:M"			5:32
6.	"pfSOTEad2"			3:42
7.	"OneZeroEight"			5:42
8.	"[B]pa-t"			5:14
9.	"pfSOTEad3"			3:58
10.	"108"	Benjamin; mpi	Mika Kobayashi, mpi	4:18
11.	"9BL00d鬼"			3:07
12.	"SOTE"			5:04
13.	"scaPEGoat (TV size)"	Hiroyuki Sawano; Benjamin; mpi	Yosh	1:34
14.	"ToBeContinued.."			2:28
Total length:				53:54

Seraph of the End Original Soundtrack (Disc 2)
No.	Title	Writer(s)	Length
1.	"Seraph of the End – Prologue"	Takafumi Wada	0:42
2.	"Seraph of the End – Epic"	Wada	3:45
3.	"Moon Demon Company" (月鬼ノ組)	Asami Tachibana	2:24
4.	"Beyond Unrest" (不安のむこう)	Megumi Shiraishi	2:07
5.	"Battlefield"	Wada	3:09
6.	"Ferid Bathory"	Wada	3:20
7.	"Commence Battle" (戦闘開始)	Tachibana	2:44
8.	"Comrade" (仲間)	Shiraishi	2:27
9.	"Invisible Sky"	Wada	3:38
10.	"Post-Apocalyptic World" (破滅後の世界)	Tachibana	3:19
11.	"The Japanese Imperial Demon Army"	Wada	2:25
12.	"Swooping Evil" (襲い来る悪)	Shiraishi	3:25
13.	"Escape" (脱出行)	Tachibana	5:28
14.	"Bizarre" (奇々怪々)	Shiraishi	3:02
15.	"Demon's Reborn"	Wada	2:34
16.	"Battle Time" (戦いの時)	Shiraishi	3:12
17.	"Reality, Destiny"	Wada	3:13
18.	"Bonds" (絆)	Tachibana	2:59
19.	"Evening" (夕景)	Shiraishi	2:45
Total length:			56:38

Seraph of the End: Battle in Nagoya Original Soundtrack
No.	Title	Writer(s)	Lyrics	Length
1.	"Dim Light" (vocals by mpi)	Hiroyuki Sawano	Benjamin; mpi	4:18
2.	"4-a"	Sawano		2:49
3.	"world wAr E"	Takafumi Wada		3:16
4.	"Asura's Power" (阿朱羅の力)	Asami Tachibana		2:08
5.	"Imperial Demon Army" (帝鬼軍)	Megumi Shiraishi		3:27
6.	"WD×2"	Sawano		3:18
7.	"In Cold Blood"	Wada		2:37
8.	"Confrontation in the Aristocracies" (貴族社会の対立)	Tachibana		2:28
9.	"Style of Monarch" (王者の風格)	Shiraishi		3:04
10.	"21科315"	Sawano		3:28
11.	"Extinction Evil"	Wada		3:37
12.	"The Existence Called Comrades" (仲間という存在)	Tachibana		2:20
13.	"With Sadness and Strength" (哀しさと強さと)	Shiraishi		3:19
14.	"WD×2 <ver.2>"	Sawano		3:18
15.	"Cataclysm" (天変地異)	Shiraishi		3:35
16.	"4-a:slow"	Sawano		3:05
17.	"Dim Light (instrumental)"	Sawano		4:18
Total length:				54:25
