= List of Seraph of the End characters =

List of characters of the Japanese manga and anime series

This is a list of characters of the Japanese manga and anime series Seraph of the End.

== Main characters ==
=== Yuichiro Hyakuya ===
Voiced by: Miyu Irino, Yū Shimamura (childhood) (Japanese); Micah Solusod (English) (anime), Romi Park (comic)
Yuichiro Hyakuya (百夜 優一郎, Hyakuya Yūichirō; Birth name: Yuichiro Amane (天音 優一郎, Amane Yūichirō))^{[LN vol. 4]} is sixteen years old. When he was twelve years old, he accompanies the children of the Hyakuya Orphanage. Ferid Bathory kills the others, except Mikaela staying at the vampire captivity and Yu escaping from there.^{[vol. 1]} One of Yu's driving forces is his burning grudge to destroy all vampires for what they did to his family and Mikaela, yet he forbids revenge to consume him and instead chooses to become strong for his new family's sake. He joins the Japanese Imperial Demon Army for vampire extermination, the Moon Demon Company in which he learns about teamwork. He is bit stubborn, but when it comes to others he is kind-hearted and genuinely cares for them. Upon finding that Mika is alive as a vampire, he is overjoyed and immediately swore to save him.^{[vol. 4]} After deciding that his new reason to live is to reclaim Mikaela from the vampires, he started to be less vengeful and places more value in friends and companionship. In the Battle of Nagoya, Yuichiro reunites with the badly wounded Mikaela, and he urges him to drink his blood to help his recovery and to keep living with him, stating that he does not care about Mikaela becoming a vampire.^{[ch. 36]} His Cursed Gear is Asuramaru (阿修羅丸, lit. Prefect Asura), a possession-type demon weapon which takes the form of a katana.^{[vol. 2]} He possesses a mysterious power that causes him to try to attack everyone calling them 'sinners'^{[ch. 13-14]}^{[ep. 11]} though he seemed to have more control over it as shown in the finale battle of Nagoya, when he attacks only his enemies and saves Mirai, Kimizuki's sister.^{[ep. 24]} It is suggested this power may be called "Seraph of the End" and gives superhuman speed, strength, reflexes and flight. He is called the "King of Salt" (塩の王, Shio no ō) after gaining a new ability in the season finale; the ability to control salt, turn people and 'Horsemen of John' into salt and create weapons with salt. Three months after the Battle in Nagoya and Yuichiro along with his comrades quit the Moon Demon Company, they were on the run from both the vampires and the humans but due to his transformation into the 'Seraph of the End' and Asuramaru's help in suppressing it in the Battle in Nagoya. He later becomes a Namanari (生成, lit. Half-Demon) after removing the curses restricting Asuramaru.^{[ch. 43]} His demon personality is exceptional violent, hateful and seductive, and often screams to be freed from his confinement. His friends therefore are diligent on keeping him restrained in this state. It is later revealed that Yu (ユ, Yu) and Asuramaru had originally met 1000 years ago, when Asuramaru was a human.^{[ch. 78-79]} Later, he and Mika fight Guren. After Mika's death and his transformation into a demon, he wanted to die, but escaped with Krul to save Mika.^{[ch. 90-94]} After Guren arrives, he decides to make Mika his demon.^{[ch. 98]} Fights with black demons to get to Mika, and later with the demon Mika.^{[ch. 101-104]} It is revealed that it was created by Shikama Doji in order to resurrect Mika in the past and present.^{[ch. 106]} In addition to this, it was shown that all of Yu's clones were strongly attached to Mikaela and could hear his voice.^{[ch. 113]} His bodies were created from some kind of eyeballs. In the present, he merges with Mika, absorbs his power and allows him to use his body, thereby Mika becomes his demon.^{[ch. 108]} After that, he leaves for Akihabara with Guren's team, where he tries to get answers from Guren.^{[ch. 111-113]} After learning that Mika can be resurrected at the same cost as all of humanity, Yu chooses Mika and betrays Guren and his friends.^{[ch. 114]} Despite Mika's persuasion, Yu is shown to have begun to regard squad as enemies. He decides to run away with Mika and uses the powers of both demons.^{[ch. 115]} While getting rid of Asuramaru, he manages to escape.^{[ch. 118]} A little later, it turns out that Yuichiro chose two options for himself: either save everyone along with Mika, or die with Mika. He does not return to the squad, but works with Mika.^{[ch. 119-121]}

=== Mikaela Hyakuya ===
Voiced by: Kenshō Ono, Haruka Chisuga (childhood) (Japanese); Justin Briner (English) (anime), Daisuke Kishio (vomic)
Mikaela Hyakuya (百夜 ミカエラ, Hyakuya Mikaera; Birth name: Mikaela Shindo (進藤 ミカエラ, Shindō Mikaera))^{[LN vol. 4]} is Yuichiro's former best friend and the other survivor of the Hyakuya Orphanage. Mikaela hatched a plan to escape from the vampire capitol with his fellow orphans.^{[ep. 1]} The attempt ended in a tragedy and he sacrificed himself in order for Yu to escape from the city of vampires, but then he was saved by Krul and turned into a vampire.^{[ch. 5]} For the next four years, he was forced to live with the vampires and in process, learning the truth about the experiments done to him and his fellow Hyakuya orphans by humans, causing him to hate both humans and vampires. He fights to meet Yu and rescue him from the humans who are manipulating and experimenting on him and from the vampires who wish to enslave humans.^{[vol. 2]} Refusing to drink human blood, Mika drinks from Krul's blood instead and thus is an incomplete vampire. He and Yu care deeply about each other. In the battle of Nagoya, he drinks Yu's blood, with the latter's consent, causing him to turn into a complete vampire.^{[ch. 36]} He becomes an unofficial member of Shinoa Squad following the battle of Nagoya. Knowing of humanity's experimentation, he is reluctant to trust the team, but tolerates them at Yu's urging and slowly comes to see them as comrades despite his emotionless demeanor. At one point, Ferid calls Mika "Angel Mikaela".^{[ch. 64]} He later dies trying to protect Yu from Guren. He transforms into a Demon after his death.^{[ch. 95]} Confesses his love to Yu before dying.^{[ch. 90]} It is revealed the Mikaela's father is Shikama Doji.^{[ch. 94]} The demons call him "The King" and "Child of Shikama". According to Guren, he is the most powerful demon and more powerful than Asuramaru, so he is not a Black Demon. Remembers nothing of his past before become a demon. Fights Yuichiro and defeats him. It falls into Yu's heart, where he learns about he's past with Yu. Later fights with Shikama and becomes Yu's demon.^{[ch. 107]} After becoming the demon Yu, he takes on the appearance of a teenager again.^{[ch. 108]} For some unknown reason, the angels call him "Cursed Child". He leaves with the others for Akihakabra, where he learns that he is Shikama Doji's child.^{[ch. 114]} He also have a Mikaela's soul in his body. After learning that Yu wants to choose him instead of all of humanity, Mika tries to convince Yu, but Yu still chooses Mika, taking away his power.^{[ch. 114]} After learning that Yuichiro has other plans, he reluctantly agrees to help Yuichiro.^{[ch. 119]} He is one of the seraph^{[ch. 64]} and has six wings.^{[ch. 93]}

=== Guren Ichinose ===
Voiced by: Yūichi Nakamura (Japanese); Dave Trosko (English) (anime), Kenji Hamada (comic)
Guren Ichinose (一瀬 グレン, Ichinose Guren) is Lieutenant Colonel, captain of the Guren Squad and the leader of the Moon Demon Company.^{[vol. 1]} He is wise, values teamwork and cooperation, scolding Yuichiro for always acting on his own. He is part of the Ichinose family, a lower branch of the Hiragi family, and is thus belittled by the high-ranking members of the Hiragis, however Guren secretly holds plans on dethroning them.^{[LN vol. 1]} He was formerly Mahiru Hiragi's lover, but when her experiments led to her become insane and transform into a demon, she killed herself in order to become his Cursed Gear Mahiru-no-yo (真昼ノ夜; lit. Midday's Night), a possession-type demon weapon which takes the form of a katana and Mahiru herself.^{[LN vol. 7]} Eight years ago, Guren used the forbidden 'Seraph of the End' power to revive his dead squad and Shinya for another ten years after being killed, which was one of the main triggers to the apocalypse.^{[ch. 47]} It is revealed that he also collaborates with vampires, in particular with Ferid. Teams up with the Shinoa squad and tells them about his goal to resurrect humanity. It is also revealed that he wants to kill Shikama. He and Mahiru betray a few other soldiers, and kills Mika to make him a demon. Guren locks Mika and ties him up with Yu to prevent Shikama from finding Mika. After that, he takes everyone to Akihabara.^{[ch. 110]} On the way there, he refuses to tell the rest of his plans.^{[ch. 113]} Guren says that the price of resurrection is the sinful keys, the lives of all vampires, and immortality for the one who resurrected humans.^{[ch. 114]} Guren forces Yu to return to the military and side with them, but they decide to turn against him, after Yu reunites with Mika.^{[ch. 115]}

=== Shinoa Hiragi ===
Voiced by: Saori Hayami (Japanese); Felecia Angelle (English) (anime), Aki Toyosaki (vomic)
Shinoa Hiragi (柊 シノア, Hīragi Shinoa) is the main female character of the story. She is Guren's sergeant and squad leader of the Shinoa Squad of the Moon Demon Company. She was sent by Guren in the beginning of the story to watch Yuichiro when he was tasked with making friends.^{[vol. 1]} She is sarcastic and enjoys teasing others, especially Yuichiro. Shinoa able to resist any demon she comes into contact with, due to the lack of desire in her heart.^{[LN vol. 7]} Her sister Mahiru Hiragi developed the Cursed Gear and she was her messenger.^{[LN vol. 2]} Despite being part of the Hiragi family, she is uninterested in their power struggle, and was constantly overshadowed by her older siblings.^{[LN vol. 3]} Additionally, she is loyal to Guren and later develops feelings for Yuichiro.^{[ch. 14, 66]} Her Cursed Weapon is Shikama Doji (四鎌童子, Shikama Dōji; lit. Four-Scythe Child), a manifestation-type demon weapon which takes the form of a large scythe, but can be condensed into a pen-like object. Shinoa becomes the vessel for Shikama Doji to save Yuichiro, but is freed from its presence by Guren, Mahiru, and Noya bе using the sinful keys. Together with the squad, she finds Yu and cooperates with Krul. She later fights Shikama Doji and confesses that she loves Yu, but loses to Shikama.^{[ch. 99]} Shikama abandons her, claiming that staying in her heart would be risky.^{[ch. 103]} Helps Yu fight against Shikama.^{[ch. 107]} After Yu chooses Mika over humanity, Shinoa is surprised and confronts him.^{[ch. 115]} She reveals her true feelings to Yuichiro, but he rejects and leaves her.^{[ch. 118]}

=== Yoichi Saotome ===
Voiced by: Nobuhiko Okamoto, Miyuki Kobori (childhood) (Japanese); Chris Burnett (English) (anime), Chikahiro Kobayashi (vomic)
Yoichi Saotome (早乙女 与一, Saotome Yoichi), is a small and frail boy and Yuichiro's first real friend and his best friend. Yoichi is kind and gentle, but decided to join the army in order to avenge his older sister, who died trying to protect him from a vampire, later revealed to be Lacus Welt. After he helped Yuichiro defeat a vampire who attacked their school, they both earned a position in the Moon Demon Company.^{[ch. 2]} He has high psychic resistance, but he is very weak physically. Hidden away from his friends, Yoichi has an extremely dark, violent side, and a massive grudge against Lacus, and wishes to kill him brutally for murdering his sister.^{[ch. 51]} His Cursed Gear is Gekkoin (月光韻, Gekkōin; lit. Moonlight Rhyme), a manifestation-type demon weapon which takes the form of a large bow.^{[vol. 2]} He later learns that his sister's corpse is kept by Guren and Yoichi is trying to kill Guren. Together with the squad, he finds Yu and cooperates with Krul. When Guren returns, he does not trust him and tries to find out information about his sister. When Gekkoin betrays him, he shows his dark side again. Learns that his sister's body is stored in Akihabara.^{[ch. 114]} After Yu chooses Mika over all of humanity, Yoichi confronts Yu.^{[ch. 115]} He is one of the seraph.^{[LN vol. 5]}

=== Shiho Kimizuki ===
Voiced by: Kaito Ishikawa (Japanese); Ian Sinclair (English) (anime) Jun Fukuyama (vomic)
Shiho Kimizuki (君月 士方, Kimizuki Shihō) is the same as Yuichiro in that he also belongs to the Moon Demon Company. He is clear headed with an excellent combat ability, but is cynical and looks like a troublemaker. He is shown to have a bad temper, but does actually care about his teammates more than he lets on. He has a sister ill in bed, and he enlisted in the army in order to get money for her to undergo the treatment for recovery.^{[ch. 4]} His Cursed Weapon is Kiseki-o (鬼箱王, Kiseki-ō; lit. King of the Demon Box), a possession-type demon weapon which takes the form of twin short swords. His sister is later killed by Guren. Later, together with the squad, he finds Yu and cooperates with Krul. When he fights Yu, he confesses to his demon that he wants to live peacefully and dislikes losing to Yu. When Guren returns, he does not trust him. After Yu chooses Mika over all of humanity, Shiho confronts Yu.^{[ch. 115]} He is one of the seraph.^{[LN vol. 5]}

=== Mitsuba Sangu ===
Voiced by: Yuka Iguchi (Japanese); Alex Moore (English) (anime), Suzuko Mimori (vomic)
Mitsuba Sangu (三宮 三葉, Sangū Mitsuba) has been with the Vampire Extermination Unit since she was 13 years old.^{[ch. 8]} After witnessing the loss of her previous squad and due to her selfishness, she focuses on teamwork. She is a hot-blooded and strict around her teammates, especially Shinoa and Yu.^{[vol. 3]} In the end, this is only because she wishes to keep her friends safe. She has an inferiority complex with her older sister, Aoi, for being more successful than her.^{[ch. 16]} Her Cursed Gear is Tenjiryu (天字竜, Tenjiryū; lit. Heaven-Shaped Dragon), a manifestation-type demon weapon which takes the form of a giant battle axe. When she returns to Shibuya with the squad, she is betrayed by Aoi. Mitsuba finds Yu with the squad and cooperates with Krul. Learns that her parents' body is stored in Akihabara.^{[ch. 114]} After Yu chooses Mika over all of humanity, Mitsuba confronts Yu.^{[ch. 115]}

=== Ferid Bathory ===
Voiced by: Takahiro Sakurai (Japanese); Eric Vale (English) (anime), Tarusuke Shingaki (vomic)
Ferid Bathory (フェリド・バートリー, Ferido Bātorī) is the Seventh Progenitor vampire who killed Yuichiro's family when they tried to escape from the city of vampire.^{[ep. 1]} He is extraordinarily strong but rather laid-back and usually speaks nonsense. He warns Mikaela not to underestimate humans when they are greedy, sneaky, and tricky. He secretly works with humans to plot something. It turns out that eight years ago he started working with Guren, and being allied with a squad of Shinoa and Guren. In the past, as a human being, he was born into the family as a second heir and his parents tried to make an ideal child out of him, so he hated his parents and killed them. Later Saito found him and wanted to make Mikaela out of him, so he turned him into a vampire, but then left him because Ferid was a failed experiment. He was also the one who turned Crowley into a vampire with Saito's blood. In the present, he works with Guren. Joins Guren's team and takes everyone to Akihabara.^{[ch. 110]} Together with others, he fights against Yu.^{[ch. 115]}

=== Krul Tepes ===
Voiced by: Aoi Yūki (Japanese); Monica Rial (English) (anime), Kana Hanazawa (vomic)
Krul Tepes (クルル・ツェペシ, Kururu Tsepeshi) is the vampire queen of Japan. She resides in the Third Capitol of the vampires Sanguinem, and also is the Third Progenitor, making her the strongest vampire in Japan. Four years ago, she saved Mikaela and turned him into a vampire.^{[ep. 4]} She cooperated with Mahiru about Seraph of the End, and was the one who turned her into a vampire.^{[vol. 10]}^{[LN vol. 5]} In her human life, she and her brother Ashera were children of a noble family who one day were attacked by an angry mob, killing her mother and setting her home ablaze, then beating and selling the two into slavery.^{[ch. 69]} Deep down, she resents being a vampire, and the First Progenitor for turning her into one.^{[ch. 49]} She was one of Shikama's predecessors to become the new Mikaela, but failed. After that, along with Lest, she was abandoned by Shikama. In the present, she helps Yu and the others save Mika. She was amazed to learn that her brother was a traitor.^{[ch. 99]} Go with the others to Akihabara and confronts Yu.^{[ch. 115]}

== Humans ==
=== Moon Demon Company ===
The Moon Demon Company (月鬼ノ組, Gekki no Kumi) is a Vampire Extermination Unit (吸血鬼殲滅部隊, Kyūketsuki Senmetsu Butai) of the Japanese Imperial Demon Army led by Guren Ichinose.

==== Guren Squad ====
Shigure Yukimi (雪見 時雨, Yukimi Shigure)
Voiced by: Yui Ishikawa (Japanese); Mallorie Rodak (English) (anime)
A Second Lieutenant of the Japanese Imperial Demon Army and another servant of Guren. She is a member of Guren's squad. She is calm and tends to hide her emotions, including her feelings for Guren. Shigure has incredible battle skills and ability to use hidden weapons. Her Cursed Gear is Kuronagi (黒凪, lit. Black nagi), another weapon belonging to the Rakshasa series; it takes form of five rings that are worn on both hands, creating strings to fool and trap enemies. Eight years ago, she was resurrected by a forbidden experiment and has two years left to live in the present. She is betrayed by Guren.
Sayuri Hanayori (花依 小百合, Hanayori Sayuri)
Voiced by: Atsumi Tanezaki (Japanese); Skyler McIntosh (English) (anime)
A Second Lieutenant of the Japanese Imperial Demon Army and Guren's servant. She is a member of Guren's Moon Demon Company squad. Since she was a child, she had a crush on Guren and provides him with emotional support. She is also an army instructor for the training classes when Guren is absent.^{[ch. 4]} Her gear is Kukuri (菊理, lit. Chrysanthemum reason), a gear from the Dakini series that takes the form as two small knives. Eight years ago, she was resurrected by a forbidden experiment and has two years left to live in the present. She is betrayed by Guren.
Mito Jujo (十条 美十, Jūjō Mito)
Voiced by: Yū Shimamura (Japanese); Trina Nishimura (English) (anime)
The daughter of the prestigious Jujo family serving under the Hiragis, and a member of Guren's squad.^{[vol. 1]}^{[LN vol. 1]} Mito is good in spellcast techniques of the Jujo family, which enhances her physical ability in battle. She has critical of her comrades, but cares about them greatly and does for their own safety. Her weapon is Kagutsuchi (火愚土, lit. Foolish earth on Fire), a weapon from the Rakshasa series. They take form of two black gauntlets that give her enough energy to kill a vampire with a single punch. Eight years ago, she was resurrected by a forbidden experiment and has two years left to live in the present. She is betrayed by Guren.
Norito Goshi (五士 典人, Goshi Norihito)
Voiced by: Daisuke Ono (Japanese); Duncan Brannan (English) (anime)
A Colonel of the Japanese Imperial Demon Army, and serves as a member of Guren's squad. He fights with illusions rather than physical attacks, and covers Guren who fights in close combat. He is laid-back, pervert, and loves beautiful women. His gear is Kakuze (覚世, lit. World of enlightenment), a gear that takes form of a Japanese smoking pipe, which can create illusions to fool opponents. Eight years ago he was resurrected by a forbidden experiment and has two years left to live in the present. He is betrayed by Guren.

==== Narumi Squad ====
Makoto Narumi (鳴海真琴, Narumi Makoto)
Voiced by: Yoshimasa Hosoya (Japanese); Ricco Fajardo (English)
A sergeant and one of the squad leaders of the Moon Demon Company.^{[ch. 25]} Narumi is teasing towards rookies when on break, but he is very serious during missions and won't tolerate clowning around, and can have a childish temper. He belonged to one of the retainer families under the Ichinose family, and has known Shusaku since preschool.^{[LN vol. 6]} He's the only remaining survivor member of the Narumi Squad after the Battle in Nagoya where his friends were slaughtered. He deserted from the Imperial Japanese Army together with the Shinoa Squad after the experiment conducted to call Seraph of the End during the Battle in Nagoya.^{[ep. 24]} Following the battle, he is considered an unofficial member of the squad. Narumi's weapon is Genbushin (玄武針, lit. Black Tortoise Needle), that takes form of a trident and shown to manifest multiple shields. At first he mistrusts Mika, but then he accepted him. He wants to resurrect his entire squad with the help of Guren. Comes to Shibuya with the others.
Shusaku Iwasaki (岩咲秀作, Iwasaki Shūsaku)
Voiced by: Daisuke Hirakawa (Japanese); Josh Grelle (English)
A member of the Moon Demon Company and Narumi's squad. Like his childhood friend Narumi, he served under the Ichinose family.^{[LN vol. 6]} He was the quiet and focused one of the group, who was full of courage and strongly supported Namuri's leadership. He died during the Battle in Nagoya as a sacrifice to the Seraph of the End experiment.^{[ep. 24]} His gear was Akahebi (赤蛇, lit. Crimson Serpent), a demon who took form of a sword and capable of chain manipulation. In the present, his body is kept in Ferid's house.
Rika Inoue (井上利香, Inoue Rika)
Voiced by: Kaori Ishihara (Japanese); Morgan Garrett (English)
A member of the Moon Demon Company and Narumi's squad. Years ago, Shusaku and Narumi rescued her during the apocalypse. She had a free spirited personality and cared deeply about her squad, to the lengths of threatening Shinoa after Yayoi and Taro were killed. Rika died during the Battle in Nagoya alongside Shusaku as a sacrifice to the Seraph of the End experiment.^{[ep. 24]} In the present, her body is kept in Ferid's house.
Yayoi Endo (円藤弥生, Endo Yayoi)
Voiced by: Emiri Katō (Japanese); Tabitha Ray (English)
A member of the Moon Demon Company and Narumi's squad.^{[vol. 7]} Like Rika, Shusaku and Narumi saved her during sometime in the apocalypse. Yayoi was kind-hearted and the peace maker of the group, but was firm and brave when confronting vampires. She got killed by vampires along with Taro during the Battle in Nagoya.^{[ep. 21]} In the present, her body is kept in Ferid's house.
Taro Kagiyama (鍵山太郎, Kagiyama Tarō)
Voiced by: Takanori Hoshino (Japanese); Chris Guerrero (English)
A member of the Moon Demon Company and Narumi's squad.^{[vol. 7]} Same with Rika and Yayoi, he was saved by Narumi and Shusaku from the apocalypse. Taro had a serious personality and a very strong sense of justice. He would hardly smile around anyone, except for his team. He died with Yayoi by the hands of vampires during the Battle in Nagoya.^{[ep. 21]} In the present, his body is kept in Ferid's house.

==== Others ====
Eita Kusunoki (楠木英太, Kusunoki Eita)
Voiced by: Seiichiro Yamashita (Japanese); Derick Snow (English)
A member of the Moon Demon Company who took part during the Battle in Nagoya.^{[ep. 16]} Before dying, he appeared before Guren to report about the enemy, and his team's situation in Nagoya City Hall.^{[ep. 17]}
Aiko Aihara (相原あい子, Aihara Aiko)
Voiced by: Ayumi Fujimura (Japanese); Lynsey Hale (English)
A sergeant and one of the squad leaders of the Moon Demon Company.^{[ep. 16]} She led three teams during the Battle in Nagoya. She encountered Mikaela as the vampires attacked her squad. She gave Mikaela information about Yuichiro whereabouts without the other vampires knowing, and gave the vampire fake information about their mission. Aiko asks Mikaela to kill her because she has nothing after all her squad members killed themselves.^{[ep. 18]}

=== Japanese Imperial Demon Army ===
Japanese Imperial Demon Army (日本帝鬼軍, Nihon Teiki Gun) is a human organization created and controlled by Hiragi Family that revived after the apocalypse.

Kureto Hiragi (柊 暮人, Hīragi Kureto)
Voiced by: Tomoaki Maeno (Japanese); Garret Storms (English) (anime)
A Lieutenant General of the Japanese Imperial Demon Army and the current head of the Hiragi family.^{[ch. 57]} He is a calm, intelligent man; but is very cruel, as Shinoa calls him a "monster" because he is merciless, even to his own siblings.^{[vol. 5]} He will retaliate against anyone who is against the Hiragi family. Kureto's main ambition is to exterminate all vampires and destroy other surviving human magic organizations, in order to have the world under the control of the Japanese Imperial Demon Army. His Cursed Gear is Raimeiki (雷鳴鬼; lit. Thunder Demon), a black katana capable of increasing strength and speed with electricity. He later overthrows his father and becomes the new leader of Hiiragi. In return, Shikama Doji tried to capture his body, but later left him. Currently fighting against the Hyakuya Sect. Together with Shinya, he was captured by the vampires because of his demon Raimei.
Shinya Hiragi (柊 深夜, Hīragi Shin'ya)
Voiced by: Tatsuhisa Suzuki (Japanese); Jerry Jewell (English) (anime)
A Major General of the Japanese Imperial Demon Army.^{[vol. 2]} When he was a child, his parents sold him to the Hiragis for a survival competition with other boys, where if one of them were to win, they'd be given Mahiru's hand in marriage. At the age of ten, Shinya ended up winning as the final survivor, became Mahiru's fiancé, and was adopted into the Hiragi family.^{[LN vol. 3]} Unlike other members of the Hiragi family, he is good friends with Guren, which makes Kureto suspicious of him. His Cursed Weapon is Byakkomaru (白虎丸; lit. White Tiger), a manifestation-type demon weapon which takes the form of a rifle and materialized as multiple white tigers. 8 years ago, Guren broke a taboo to resurrect Shinya, although it didn't work out at first. In the present, he has 2 years left to live. Later, Guren betrays him and nearly kills him. In the present, together with the others, he is trying to find Guren. Possibly in love with Guren. Together with Kureto, he was captured by the vampires because of his demon Byakko.
Seishiro Hiragi (柊 征志郎, Hīragi Seishirō)
Voiced by: Hiroyuki Yoshino (Japanese); Justin Cook (English) (anime)
A Major General of the Japanese Imperial Demon Army. He is crude and often offensive. Kureto regards him as a coward, as he never takes place on the front lines. He has an inferiority complex because of his brother, Kureto and is planning to defeat him one day. He wields the weapon Kushitamahime (櫛玉姫, lit. Princess of gem comb), which takes form of a sword. In the present, he becomes a prisoner of Hiiragi, since Shikama can take his body as well.
Tenri Hiragi (柊 天利, Hiiragi Tenri)
Voiced by: Keiji Fujiwara (Japanese); Christopher Sabat (English) (anime)
A General with the highest rank in the Japanese Imperial Demon Army, and the former head of the Hiragi family.^{[vol. 2]} He was a dictator who strongly believed in the concept of "the survival of the fittest" and hence strived to create a system in which only the strong will survive and the weak will perish. Tenri got killed by Kureto in order to steal his place as the head of the family.^{[ch. 57]}
Aoi Sangu (三宮 葵, Sangū Aoi)
Voiced by: Ayako Kawasumi (Japanese); Sarah Wiedenheft (English) (anime)
Mitsuba's older sister and a member of the Japanese Imperial Demon Army who works under the Hiragi family.^{[ch. 16]} She serves as Kureto's personal assistant and loyal servant, and will follow all of his orders without hesitation. Despite being her sister, Aoi is normally aloof to Mitsuba and ignores her, claiming her to be a weakling. She does especially after Mitsuba betrayed the Japanese Imperial Demon Army with the rest of the Shinoa squad, now only viewing her as a traitor.^{[ch. 70]} In love with Kureto. Together with him, he fights against the Hyakuya sect.

=== Hyakuya Orphanage ===
The Hyakuya Orphanage is a group of children, and the past families of Yu and Mika, whom Ferid killed at the beginning of the series.^{[ep. 1]}

Akane Hyakuya (百夜 茜, Hyakuya Akane)
Voiced by: Yō Taichi (anime), Yuki Yoshinari (vomic) (Japanese); Megan Shipman (English)
One of the oldest children in the orphanage alongside Yūichirō and Mikaela. She was positive, upbeat, and acted as the elder sister of the Hyakuya Orphanage.^{[ep. 1]} Ferid kept her severed head for the last four years and taunted Yu and Mika about it upon meeting again.^{[ch. 46]} In the novel, it is revealed that she is in love with Mika. Her and other kids body is kept in Akihabara.^{[ch. 114]}
Chihiro Hyakuya (百夜 千尋, Hyakuya Chihiro)
Voiced by: Reika Uyama (Japanese); Leah Clark (English) (anime)
A fellow female orphan that lived alongside Mikaela and Yuichiro, who was a few years younger than them. Like everyone else who lived in the orphanage, she was a playful and innocent child.
Kota Hyakuya (百夜 香太, Hyakuya Kōta)
Voiced by: Haruka Shimizu (Japanese); Alexis Tipton (English) (anime)
An orphan about the same age as Chihiro. He got along very well with his other orphans and saw Yu and Mika as his elder brothers.
Ako Hyakuya (百夜 亜子, Hyakuya Ako)
Voiced by: Marie Miyake (Japanese); Sarah Wiedenheft (English) (anime)
One of the youngest and smallest children of the orphanage. She adored her family, and saw Akane, Yu, and Mika as her elder siblings.
Fumie Hyakuya (百夜 文絵, Hyakuya Fumie)
Voiced by: Chitose Morinaga (Japanese); Kristin Sutton (English) (anime)
One of the few younger children of the Hyakuya orphan, that had been cheerful and playful with the rest of the orphans.
Taichi Hyakuya (百夜 太一, Hyakuya Taichi)
Voiced by: Miyuki Kobori (Japanese); Tia Ballard (English) (anime)
One of the youngest and smallest children of the orphanage, that was optimistic and happy like the rest of his fellow orphans in spite of getting captured by vampires. His body with Akane's is the second contained inside Ferid's mansion in Osaka.^{[ch. 55]}
Junji Haiyama (浜山順治, Haiyama Junji)
A sensitive and tearful four-year-old orphan that appeared in the Guren Ichinose: Catastrophe at Sixteen novel series. Mahiru adopted him from the Hyakuya Orphanage under a false identity for a test subject. Once departing from the orphanage, he got knocked out by Mahiru and then was attacked by multiple vampires. After Mahiru mentioned Krul Tepes, Junji and she were taken away by them.^{[LN vol. 5]}

=== Others ===
Mahiru Hiragi (柊 真昼, Hiiragi Mahiru)
Voiced by: Aya Endō (anime) (Japanese); Alexis Tipton (English)
Shinoa's older sister and the main heroine of the prequel story, Seraph of the End: Guren Ichinose: Catastrophe at Sixteen. She was Guren's former lover, and a competing heir to the Hiragi family against Kureto. In the past, she was Shinya's fiancée, and greatly admired by everyone for her strength and Hiragi status.^{[LN vol. 1]} Mahiru later betrayed her family by joining the Hyakuya Sect. She eventually turned into a demon due to experimentation, and she sacrificed herself to become the demon inside Guren's weapon.^{[LN vol. 7]} Mahiru's the one who had developed the Cursed Gear, and the first owner of Cursed Gear Black Demon Series Asuramaru before Yuichiro.^{[LN vol. 1]} Encourages Guren to betray all of his friends. She later participates in a plan to transform Mika into a demon and gives Guren a drug to inject Mika. Eight years ago she signed a contract with Krul and was turned into a vampire by her. In the present, she helps Guren to imprison Mika in sword and contain Shikama along with Shinoa. Shikama leaves her body later. Also goes to Akihabara and helps Guren fight against Yu.^{[ch. 115]}
Mirai Kimizuki (君月 未来, Kimizuki Mirai)
Voiced by: Tomoyo Kurosawa (Japanese); Bryn Apprill (English) (anime)
Shiho's younger sister who is ill in bed. Kimizuki enlisted in the army to get money in order for her to undergo the treatment.^{[ep. 4]} She was experimented by the Japanese Imperial Army. She became a Seraph of the End and her demon was called Abaddon, the demon of destruction during the final phase of Battle in Nagoya. Under the control of Kureto Hiragi, she went on a rampage killing both humans and vampires until Yu stops her in his 'Seraph of the End' mode.^{[ep. 24]} She is killed by Guren for her sinful key.^{[ch. 84]} Shiho takes her corpse to Akihabara.^{[ch. 114]}
Tomoe Saotome (早乙女 巴, Saotome Tomoe)
Voiced by: Yōko Hikasa (Japanese); Kara Edwards (English) (anime)
Yoichi's older sister whom Lacus killed.^{[vol. 2]} Her body is kept by Guren. At the moment, her body is kept in Akihabara.^{[ch. 114]} She is one of the seraph.^{[LN vol. 5]}

== Vampires ==
=== Progenitors ===
Urd Geales (ウルド・ギールス, Urudo Giirusu)
Urd is a Second Progenitor of the vampires and rules over the vampires in Russia.^{[ch. 42]} He was sired by the first progenitor of vampires alongside Krul and Saito. Urd possesses good judgment and a calm, nonchalant attitude. Most information on him is still unknown except that he enjoys watching humans dance and sing, and that he values their lives more than his other vampire counterparts.^{[vol. 11]} Along with Saito, assisted Shikama in the past with his experiments. Possibly Saito's brother. When Shikama left him and Saito, Saito abandoned him, although Urd was against his leaving, so in the present Urd hates Saito. Built a special prison to contain Saito, but ultimately captures Shinya and Kureto, and joins forces with Saito against Shikama.^{[ch. 114]} Was one of the bodies for Mikaela, but failed.
Crowley Eusford (クローリー・ユースフォード, Kurōrī Yūsufōdo)
Voiced by: Kenichi Suzumura (Japanese); Austin Tindle (English) (anime) Hiroaki Hirata (vomic)
Crowley is the Thirteenth Progenitor. He is under faction led by Ferid Bathory. He appeared in the battle for Shinjuku and showed his powerful ability that can even overpower multiple soldiers armed with Black Demon weapons. Crowley is relaxed and never intimidated by other opponents. He encounters the Shinoa Squad in the battle of Shinjuku with Horn and Chess.^{[vol. 3]} He hides his true strength that is equal to that of a Seventh progenitor. He was given the blood of the second progenitor Saito, by Ferid. He later becomes an ally of Shinoa Squad following their defection from the Demon Army and mentors Yuichiro in combat. While the squad is initially distrustful of Crowley, he slowly proves himself invaluable and trustworthy to the team and helps them rescue Ferid from Ky Luc and fighting the Hyakuya Sect in Shibuya. Despite being a progenitor, he has not killed a single human since becoming a vampire, and unlike most vampires, has maintained some sense of emotion, empathy, and sympathy since turning. In the 13th century, he was a crusader who fought for God, but his friends were killed by Ferid. He met Ferid over eight hundred years ago. In the present, he helps him. Together with Ferid, he joins Guren's team and they go to Akihabara.^{[ch. 110]} Together with others, he confronts Yu.^{[ch. 115]}
Horn Skuld (ホーン・スクルド, Hōn Sukurudo)
Voiced by: Yōko Hikasa (Japanese); Mikaela Krantz (English) (anime)
The Seventeenth Progenitor. She has certain reason to serve Crowley, and prefers to drink his blood than human blood. She acts like an elder sister towards Chess.
Chess Belle (チェス・ベル, Chesu Beru)
Voiced by: Nozomi Furuki (Japanese); Lauren Allison (English) (anime)
The Seventeenth Progenitor alongside Horn. She serves under Crowley with Horn, and has a carefree, careless personality. She often cannot stop her desire when drinking human blood until the human is dead.
Lest Karr (レスト・カー, Resuto Kā)
Voiced by: Yumiko Kobayashi (Japanese); Lara Woodhull (English) (anime)
A Third Progenitor, like Krul, who manages Europe.^{[ch. 22]} He is two centuries younger than Krul, but claims that he's stronger than her. He warns Krul of her mishandled management of Japan. He was turned into vampire by Shikama. Along with Krul, he was abandoned by Shikama in the past. He is helping Urd currently and teams up with Saito against Shikama.^{[ch. 114]} Was one of the bodies for Mikaela, but failed.
Ky Luc (キ・ルク, Ki Ruku)
A Fifth Progenitor of vampires. He possesses a calm but also cautious attitude.^{[ch. 51]} Not much is exactly known about him other than he's extremely powerful, and capable of handling an army of soldiers all on his own. Fought against the people of Guren. He is helping Urd currently and teams up with Saito against Shikama.^{[ch. 114]}
Lucal Wesker (ルカル・ウェスカー, Rukaru Uesukā)
Voiced by: Takehito Koyasu (Japanese); Chuck Huber (English) (anime)
A Fifteenth Progenitor and a member of Lest Karr's faction. He kills himself when being overwhelmed by Shinoa and Narumi's joint squad as their mission during the Battle in Nagoya. He sacrificed his servant Esther Lee to block their first attack.
Mel Stefano (メル・ステファノ, Meru Sutefano)
Voiced by: Cris George (English) (anime)
A Nineteenth Progenitor that had been killed by Guren's squad during the battle in Nagoya.

=== Others ===
Rene Simm (レーネ・シム, Rēne Shimu)
Voiced by: Yuichiro Umehara (Japanese); Alex Organ (English) (anime)
Rene is in charge of city guard with Lacus and Mikaela. He is not a noble but his combat ability is very high. He believes humans are greedy, arrogant creatures, and is cautious of the Japanese Imperial Demon Army's soldiers' fanatical state. Rene is rarely apart from Lacus, as he is his only true friend.
Lacus Welt (ラクス・ウェルト, Rakusu Ueruto)
Voiced by: Takuma Nagatsuka (Japanese); Aaron Roberts (English) (anime)
A vampire in charge of the city guard with Mikaela. He has high combat ability even though he is not a noble. He is generally nice to Mika however wouldn't care if he were to die. He is the vampire who killed Yoichi's sister. He often cannot stop his desire for blood and sucks the human dry. Lacus's main target for blood is from young, teenage boys and was stated to have older and younger siblings when he was human.
Esther Lee (エスター・リー, Esutā Rī)
Voiced by: Hiroshi Naka (Japanese); R. Bruce Elliott (English)
Lucal's servant who was sacrificed to block the first attack made by Shinoa and Narumi's joint squad as their mission during the Battle in Nagoya.
Saito (斉藤, Saitō)
A member of the Hyakuya Sect that worked alongside Mahiru.^{[LN vol. 1]} He is the former Second Progenitor of vampires and one who had sired Ferid.^{[ch. 49]} Saito has a sense of dark humor, is cold towards others, and goes to great lengths to hide his true strength. Saito's nature and true objective is unclear, other than that he is invested in the 'Seraph of the End' project. In the past, he was turned into a vampire by Shikama. Together with Urd, he helped Shikama in his experiments. Also, like Shikama, he tried to create a new Mikaela and Mika became the only successful experiment in this. He created the Hyakuya sect, and members of the Ichinose clan are carriers of his genes. In the past, he abandoned Urd in order to find Shikama and take revenge on him, which remains his goal to this day. In the present, he and Urd are joining forces against Shikama.^{[ch. 114]} Was one of the bodies for Mikaela, but failed.

== Demons ==
Asuramaru (阿朱羅丸, Ashūramaru; lit. Prefect Asura)
Voiced by: Hibiku Yamamura (Japanese); Colleen Clinkenbeard (English) (anime)
A demon residing inside the Cursed Gear of Black Demon Series formerly owned by Mahiru Hiragi, and for Yū.^{[vol. 2]} Just like the other demons, Asuramaru disfavors love and likes desire even though he wants to be loved by Yū, despite he have an dislike and adversion toward humans like all demons, considering humans more terryfing than vampires and demons. He is often surprised by the gentle side of Yuichiro and gives power whenever he asks for it. He becomes friends with Yuichiro later on the series. Asuramaru's true identity is Ashera Tepes, Krul's older brother who turned into a demon after departing from her with the First Progenitor of vampires.^{[LN vol. 5]}^{[ch. 49, 69]} He is unable to remember his identity, only recalling fragments and that he has a little sister, but remembers her during the Shibuya Arc. Asuramaru memories return completely after Mikaela transforms into a demon. Asuramaru and the other black demons are all working with Shikama Doji to enact a plan that will save the world from a incoming catastrophe according the Shikama Doji. He is one of the apostles of Shikama Doji. He was overwhelmed by Yu, but Yu later asks for his help in fighting Guren's team.^{[ch. 115]} He was one of Shikama's predecessors to become the new Mikaela, but failed. He, along with Noya, is one of the youngest demons of the Black Demon Series.
Kiseki-o (鬼籍王, Kiseki-ō; lit. King of the Demon Box)
Voiced by: Tomoyo Kurosawa (Japanese); Bryn Apprill (English) (anime)
A demon residing in the Cursed Gear of Black Demon Series, owned by Shiho.^{[vol. 2]} Kiseki-O hates giving in to the ones weaker than him. Works with Shikama Doji. His memories are fully restored after Mika becomes a demon. He is one of the apostles of Shikama Doji and, along with Asuramaru and Gekkoin, tried to take Mika's soul. Was defeated by Yuichiro. One of the oldest demons.
Gekkouin (月光韻, Gekkōin; lit. Moonlight Rhyme)
A demon rises inside the Cursed Gear of Black Demon Series owned by Yoichi.^{[vol. 2]} Eventually, Gekkōin and Yoichi become friends. The two sometimes discuss about their favorite colors in Yoichi's dreams. He plans on helping Yoichi defeat Lacus and enjoys his darker side.^{[ch. 51]} Works with Shikama Doji. His memories are fully restored after Mika becomes a demon. He is one of the apostles of Shikama Doji and, along with Asuramaru and Kiseki-O, tried to take Mika's soul. Was defeated by Yuichiro. One of the oldest demons.
Raimeiki (雷鳴鬼, Raimeiki; lit. Thunder Demon)
A demon that resides in Kureto's Cursed Gear of Black Demon Series. She became his demon even before the apocalypse. She is the only female demon. Helped Kureto fight against Shikama.^{[ch. 59]} Her memories are fully restored after Mika becomes a demon.^{[ch. 98]} She is revealed to be working with Shikama.^{[ch. 102]} She is one of the apostles of Shikama Doji. One of the oldest demons. After Kureto was kidnapped, she was crushed by Saito.^{[ch. 107]}
Byakkomaru (白虎丸, Byakkomaru; lit. White Tiger)
A demon that resides in Shinya's Cursed Gear of Black Demon Series. He became his demon even before the apocalypse. Unlike other demons, he cares a lot about Shinya and refuses to give him much power. He tried to convince Shinya that Guren was a danger and threatened Mahiru if she harmed Shinya. His memories are fully restored after Mika becomes a demon.^{[ch. 98]} He is revealed to be working with Shikama.^{[ch. 102]} He is one of the apostles of Shikama Doji. One of the oldest demons. After Shinya was kidnapped, he was crushed by Saito.^{[ch. 107]}
Noya (ノ夜, Noya; lit. Of Night)
A demon that resides in Guren's Cursed Gear of Black Demon Series. He became Guren's Demon when the Tokyo school was attacked. Unlike other demons, he had memories from the very beginning. After the start of the apocalypse, Mahiru absorbs Noya and he leaves her body only after 8 years.^{[ch. 82]} Helped Guren defeat Yu and Mika, but was unaware of their plans regarding Mika.^{[ch. 92]} He is revealed to be working with Shikama.^{[ch. 102]} He is one of the apostles of Shikama Doji. He, along with Asuramaru, is one of the youngest demons of the Black Demon Series. Was one of the bodies for Mikaela, but failed.

== Angels ==
Shikama Doji (四鎌童子, Shikama Dōji; lit. Four-Scythe Child)
A manifestation-type demon residing inside the Cursed Gear owned by Shinoa. Unlike some demons, Shikama is very quiet and gets along well with Shinoa.^{[vol. 2]} He was formerly the First Progenitor of vampires; first known as Sika Madu, until he abandoned them thousands of years ago with Ashera Tepes and became a demon.^{[ch. 49, 57, 69]} He created Yu hundreds of years ago that Yu help him resurrect Mika. He was the one who created the Hiiragi clan. Shikama historically has possessed every head of the Hiragi family for generations, and currently is possessing Shinoa and Kureto at the same time. It is later revealed that Mikaela is his son. He later abandons Shinoa, claiming that staying in her heart is too risky. His real goal is to bring back his child Mikaela. He experimented on humans for over 600 years for this purpose and made more vampires, but for some reason abandoned their later. In the present, he again wants to return Mika, so he orders the demons to capture his soul. He also wants to save the world from a kind of apocalypse. In the past, he was an angel, but was expelled from heaven for other's sins. As punishment, he was turned into a vampire, his child was killed and the sun was taken away, so Shikama tries to create his black sun and hates the god. He was captured by Saito. It was revealed that he was the one who created Hyakuya orphanage and Mika. He has no gender.^{[ch. 113]}
Mikaela (ミカエラ, Mikaera)
Shikama's real child. For some unknown reason, he was killed by the gods centuries ago and Shikama kept his corpse in Greece.^{[ch. 94]} Shikama tried to create new vessels for his child's soul, but they all failed.^{[ch. 85]} Shikama was also created Yu to help him resurrect Mikaela.^{[ch. 106]} Centuries later, Shikama created Mika, who the only successful vessel for his child and at the moment, Mikaela's soul is in Mika's body.^{[ch. 114]} According to Yu, Mikaela could contact him. Like his father, he has no gender.^{[ch. 113]}
