= Mummy (undead) =

Undead monster

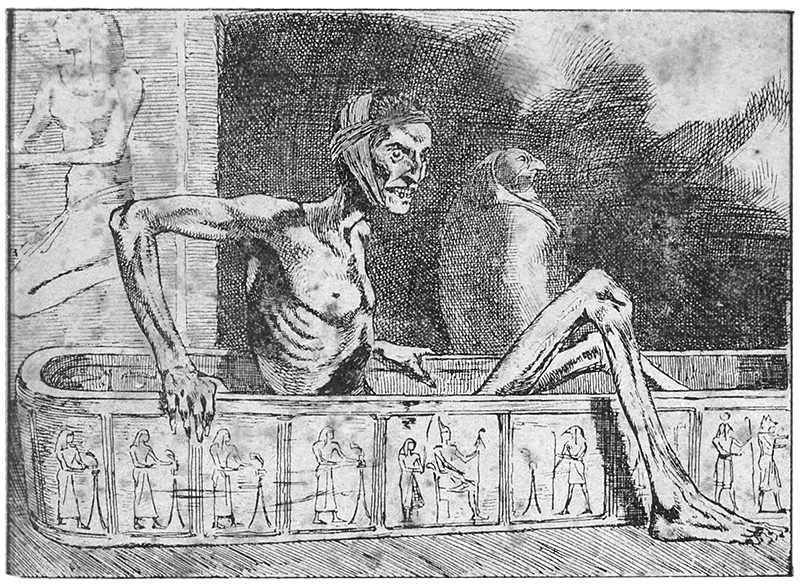
An illustration by Martin van Maële of the mummy from "Lot No. 249" an 1892 Gothic horror short story by British writer Arthur Conan Doyle.

Mummies are commonly featured in horror genres as undead creatures wrapped in bandages. Similar undead include skeletons, zombies and vampires.

== History ==
The mummy genre has its origins in the 19th century when Ottoman-controlled Egypt was being colonized by France and, subsequently, by Victorian Britain. The first living mummies in fiction were mostly female, and they were presented in a romantic and sexual light, often as love interests for the protagonist; this metaphorically represented the sexualized Orientalism and the colonial romanticization of the East. Notable examples of this trend include "The Mummy's Foot" by Théophile Gautier, The Jewel of Seven Stars by Bram Stoker, "The Ring of Thoth" by Arthur Conan Doyle, She: A History of Adventure and "Smith and the Pharaohs" by H. Rider Haggard, "My New Year's Eve Among the Mummies" by Grant Allen, "The Unseen Man's Story" by Julian Hawthorne, and Iras: A Mystery by H. D. Everett; the latter actually has the protagonist marry a mummy which takes on the form of a beautiful woman.

Starting from the 1930s, the "romantic mummy" was supplanted by the "monster mummy", pioneered by Boris Karloff in the 1932 movie The Mummy; mummies thus joined the pantheon of 19th century Gothic monsters, alongside Count Dracula and Frankenstein's monster.

However, the end of the 20th century saw the revival of interest in the "romantic mummy" archetype, starting with the 1989 novel The Mummy, or Ramses the Damned by Anne Rice, which involved a sexual relationship between a benevolent male mummy and a female archaeologist. The trend intensified throughout the late 1990s, the 2000s, and the 2010s: modern works of fiction featuring romanticized living mummies include the 1997 horror fiction novella Don't Tell Mummy by Tom B. Stone, the "Inca Mummy Girl" episode of the TV series Buffy the Vampire Slayer, the 2006 fantasy novel Freaks: Alive on the Inside by Annette Curtis Klause, and the 2011 video game The Next Big Thing by Pendulo Studios.

== Literature ==
- "The Magic Mirror" (German: "Der Zauberspiegel"), an 1818 short story by Ludwig von Baczko, has an enchanted mirror held by a mummy that comes alive when a character attempts to destroy the mirror. It was translated into English in the annual Forget Me Not For 1823, published in late 1822.
- Another one of the earliest examples of undead mummies is The Mummy!: Or a Tale of the Twenty-Second Century, an 1827 novel written by Jane C. Loudon. This early science-fiction work concerns an Egyptian mummy named Cheops, who is brought back in to life in the 22nd century.
- "The Awakener in the Desert" (German: "Der Wecker in der Wüste"), an 1838 poem by Ferdinand Freiligrath, has an Egyptian pharaoh woken from the dead by a lion's roar. It was translated into English several times, including by John Oxenford (1842), Charles Rann Kennedy (1843), and Charles Timothy Brooks (1846). (Note: Freiligrath's "Der Wecker in der Wüste" was also translated by Joseph Gostick (1845), Lewis Filmore (1845), William Barber (1849), and George Ebenezer Shirley (1852).)
- "The Mummy's Foot" (1840) by Théophile Gautier concerns a ghostly Egyptian princess who, hoping to recover her lost foot, takes the protagonist on a journey through time to her homeland.
- "Some Words with a Mummy" (1845) by Edgar Allan Poe is another early example of a story about a resurrected mummy, though played for satire instead of horror.
- "Lost in a Pyramid; or, The Mummy's Curse" (1869) by Louisa May Alcott is an early example of the "mummy's curse" genre.
- "Lot No. 249" (1892) by Arthur Conan Doyle has been called "...the first to depict a reanimated mummy as a sinister, dangerous creature." Doyle's 1890 short story "The Ring of Thoth" also features a mummy, though of a more benevolent nature.
- "The Story of Baelbrow" (1898) by Kate and Hesketh Hesketh-Prichard is another early story featuring a malevolent mummy, with the case investigated by occult detective Flaxman Low.
- The Jewel of Seven Stars (1903) by Bram Stoker is an early tale of possession by a mummy.
- "The Nemesis of Fire" (1908) by Algernon Blackwood features a mummy protected by elemental magic, investigated by John Silence.
- "Imprisoned with the Pharaohs" (1924) attributed to illusionist Harry Houdini but ghostwritten by H. P. Lovecraft, tells the first-person story of Houdini's encounter with a mummified cult in a hidden temple beneath the Great Sphinx of Giza.
- Several of the Jules de Grandin short stories by Seabury Quinn featured resurrected mummies, including "The Grinning Mummy" (1926), "The Bleeding Mummy" (1932), "The Dead-Alive Mummy" (1935), and "The Man in Crescent Terrace" (1946).
- "Monkeys" (1930, anthologized in More Spook Stories the following year) by E. F. Benson tells the tale of a doctor whose visions of monkeys dovetails into legends of mummies in ancient Egypt.
- "Out of the Aeons" (1935) by H. P. Lovecraft and Hazel Heald links a mysterious mummy (albeit one not of Egyptian origin) to his Cthulhu Mythos.
- "Eyes of the Mummy" (1938) by Robert Bloch reverses the typical "possession" narrative established in The Jewel of Seven Stars by having the protagonist's consciousness transferred into a mummy's body. It was included in the author's 1945 collection of stories The Opener of the Way.
- The Vengeance of Ai (1939) by August Derleth and Mark Schorer, eventually anthologized in Colonel Markesan and Less Pleasant People (1966), features a vengeance-minded mummy.
- EC Comics' series Tales from the Crypt, The Haunt of Fear, and The Vault of Horror featured mummies in their stories. Tales from the Crypt #33 revealed that the Crypt-Keeper's parents are a 4,000-year-old female Egyptian mummy and a two-headed corpse.
- Marvel Comics has its own mummies including N'Kantu, the Living Mummy.
- The Mummy, or Ramses the Damned (1989) by Anne Rice tells the story of an immortal mummy revived by Edwardian era archaeologists. It was followed in 2017 by a sequel.
- The mummies are featured in The Kane Chronicles.
- The Goosebumps franchise featured mummies in its different stories.
  - The Curse of the Mummy's Tomb featured an assortment of mummies.
  - Return of the Mummy featured the Mummy of Prince Kho-ru who was the fictional cousin of King Tut.
  - Diary of a Mad Mummy featured the Mummy of King Buthramaman.
  - The Mummy Walks featured the Mummy of Emperor Pukrah of Jekeziah.
  - The Tales to Give You Goosebumps story "Don't Wake Mummy" featured a mummy. The television adaption of this episode also featured the mummy's cat.
  - Who's Your Mummy featured an assortment of mummies.
  - The Dummy Meets the Mummy featured the Mummy of Arragotus.

== Television ==
- In 1966, Mummy Man was a revived ancient creature that attacked a research facility. His demise led to the summoning of Dodongo in episode 12 of Ultraman.
- The two 1970–1971 TV series Sabrina the Teenage Witch and Groovie Goolies feature a character named Mummy (voiced by Howard Morris impersonating Ed Wynn) who is one of the Groovie Goolies.
- Robot mummies were featured in the Doctor Who serial Pyramids of Mars (1975), which was influenced by the mummy films from the Hammer Horror series.
- The 1980 TV series Drak Pack features a super-strong mummy named Mummyman (voiced by Chuck McCann) who is a member of the evil organization OGRE.
- The 1985 version of ThunderCats features a mummified demonic sorcerer named Mumm-Ra (voiced by Earl Hammond and Robin Atkin Downes) as the series' primary antagonist.
- The 1990 TV series Gravedale High features mummy characters like Cleofatra (voiced by Ricki Lake) and Mr. Tutner (voiced by Tim Curry).
- In Big Bad Beetleborgs, the character Mums is a mummy that resides at Hillhurst.
- Mummies Alive!, a 1997 animated series, featured a group of heroic mummies.
- The anime franchise for Digimon features Mummymon.
- The main protagonist of the 2003—2008 TV series Tutenstein is a re-awakened mummy.
- In the Ben 10 franchise, there is a race of alien mummies called Thep Khufans. Ben Tennyson's alien form Snare-oh (originally called Benmummy) is a Thep Khufan.
- Some Mummy Monsters appeared in Super Sentai:
  - In Seiju Sentai Gingaman, the monster Morgumorgu is a mummy-themed monster. In Power Rangers Lost Galaxy, the monster was adapted as Crumummy.
  - In Kyuukyuu Sentai GoGoFive, the monster Zombeast is a mummy-themed Psyma Beast. In Power Rangers Lightspeed Rescue, the monster was used for one of the unidentified defeated demons in the Shadow World.
  - In Mahou Sentai Magiranger, the villain Sorcery Priest Meemy is a mummy. In Power Rangers Mystic Force, he is adapted as Imperious.
  - In Tensou Sentai Goseiger, the monster Zeibu of the Mummy is a mummy-like creature with centipede-like features. In Power Rangers Megaforce, he is adapted as Mummy who is one of the illusions of the monster Distractor.
  - In Kishiryu Sentai Ryusoulger, the Mummy Minosaur is a mummy-like Minosaur clad in pyramid-like armor. In Power Rangers Dino Fury, it is adapted as Tombtress.
- In Ugly Americans, there are mummies living in Manhattan. One Mummy is revealed to be the mother of Francis Grimes as seen in "Mummy Dearest."
- The Jim Henson Company's "Henson Alternative" banner had different mummy characters:
  - In Late Night Liars, the character William A. Mummy (performed by Brian Clark) is one of the main characters. He is a flamboyant mummy who Shelley Oceans' ex-wife and a parody of Paul Lynde.
  - In No, You Shut Up!, Andy Al-Jizah (also performed by Brian Clark) is a mummy who is the President of the AAMRP (short for American Association of Mummified and/or Retired People).
- In an episode of Jake and the Neverland Pirates, some people believe that the crook and flail has the power to bring mummies to life.
- The anime series Monster Musume features Mummies where they are depicted as a subspecies of the Zombies. As the desert environments have made their skin dry, the Mummies must take long baths to replenish their fluids and even do this by sucking the life force out of humans to supplement their beauty as a placebo.
- The TV series OK K.O.! Let's Be Heroes features the character Ms. Mummy (voiced by Ashly Burch) who is a regular of Lakewood Plaza Turbo. She lives behind Gar's Hero Supply & Bodega.

== Film ==
During the 20th century, horror films and other mass media popularized the notion of a curse associated with mummies (see Curse of the pharaohs). The 1922 discovery of Tutankhamun's tomb by archaeologist Howard Carter brought mummies into the mainstream.

- One of the earliest appearances was The Jewel of Seven Stars, a horror novel by Bram Stoker first published in 1903 that concerned an archaeologist's plot to revive an ancient Egyptian mummy. This book later served as the basis for the 1971 film Blood from the Mummy's Tomb, the 1980 film The Awakening and the 1997 direct-to-video film Bram Stoker's Legend of the Mummy.
- Films representing such a belief include the 1932 movie The Mummy starring Boris Karloff as Imhotep; four subsequent 1940s' Universal Studios mummy films which featured a mummy named Kharis, and a 1959 Hammer remake of The Mummy's Hand and The Mummy's Tomb, which also featured Kharis. The belief in cursed mummies probably stems in part from the supposed curse on the tomb of Tutankhamun.
- In 1979, the American Broadcasting Company aired a TV holiday show, The Halloween That Almost Wasn't, in which a mummy from Egypt (Robert Fitch) arrived at Count Dracula's castle without speaking.
- Slapstick comedy trio The Three Stooges humorously exploited the discovery in the short film We Want Our Mummy, in which they explored the tomb of the midget King Rutentuten (and his Queen, Hotsy Totsy). A decade later, they played crooked used chariot salesmen in Mummy's Dummies, in which they ultimately assisted a different King Rootentootin (Vernon Dent) with a toothache.
- Comedy duo Abbott and Costello, as part of their series crossing over with the Universal Monsters, encountered a mummy named Klaris (a parody of Kharis) in 1955's Abbott and Costello Meet the Mummy.
- A Mummy was featured in the film Mad Monster Party?. He does not speak and is among the monsters invited to Baron Boris von Frankenstein's castle on the Isle of Evil. The Mummy's sarcophagus was carried to Baron Frankenstein's castle by the Hunchback of Notre Dame. In one scene, the Mummy dances with the Monster's Mate to "Do the Mummy" by Little Tibia and the Fibias.
- A Mummy was featured in Mad Mad Mad Monsters, voiced by Allen Swift. He is among the monsters invited by Baron Henry von Frankenstein to attend the wedding of the Frankenstein Monster and his Bride at the Transylvania Astoria Hotel on Friday the 13th.
- The Disney Channel film Under Wraps featured a mummy that was named Harold (performed by Bill Fagerbakke).
- The Halloweentown franchise featured different mummies.
- A new Hollywood series of films featuring an immortal undead high priest began with The Mummy in 1999. The film was a box-office success and was followed by two sequels, The Mummy Returns in 2001 and The Mummy: Tomb of the Dragon Emperor in 2008. The first two movies featured the mummy of Imhotep (portrayed by Arnold Vosloo) and the third movie featured the mummy of Emperor Han (portrayed by Jet Li).
- The Night at the Museum franchise featured some mummies. Unlike in most portrayals of mummies, the magic is so thorough that the mummies are restored to full life-like appearance, as opposed to simple reanimation:
  - Night at the Museum centers around the tablet of Ahkmenrah (portrayed by Rami Malek), intended to keep his family together forever, by granting life to his mummy.
  - Night at the Museum: Battle of the Smithsonian introduced the mummy of Ahkmenrah's brother Kahmunrah (portrayed by Hank Azaria) who plotted to use the same tablet to open a portal to the Egyptian underworld.
  - In Night at the Museum: Secret of the Tomb, the Ahkmenrah's parents Merenkahre and Shepseheret (portrayed by Ben Kingsley and Anjali Jay) appear with the tablet providing similar effects. There are also some mummies in glass containers.
- The Hotel Transylvania franchise features Murray the Mummy (voiced by CeeLo Green in the first movie, Keegan-Michael Key in the second movie) as one of the main characters. In addition, there was also a female mummy that made background cameos.
- The 2017 film The Mummy features the mummy of Ahmanet (portrayed by Sofia Boutella).
- The 2024 film Monster Mash featured a mummy named Ramesses (portrayed by Adam Slemmon). Dr. Victor Frankenstein has his monstrous creation Boris target Ramses the Third for his heart in order to build his ultimate creation. The removal of his heart reduces Ramesses to sand. While on the trail of his abducted daughter Elisabeta, Count Dracula happens upon what's left of Ramesses and uses a combination of a compatible heart and blood magic to revive Ramses. Afterwards, Ramses joins forces with Count Dracula, Invisible Man, and a werewolf named Charles Conlin to rescue Elisabeta and fight Dr. Frankenstein.
- The 2026 film Lee Cronin's The Mummy Katie Cannon (portrayed by Natalie Grace), the young daughter of journalist Charlie Cannon (portrayed by Jack Reynor), disappears without a trace in the desert. Eight years later, the devastated family is stunned when Katie suddenly reappears. However, what should be a joyful reunion soon turns into a terrifying nightmare.
- The upcoming 2027 film The Mummy: Book of the Dead is a direct sequel to The Mummy (1999) and The Mummy Returns (2001), ignoring the events of The Mummy: Tomb of the Dragon Emperor (2008), and the fourth installment in The Mummy series.

== Video games ==
- In the PlayStation and PC versions of Breakout (2000), a Mummy is the boss of the Egyptian Lair as Bouncer must rescue one of his friends from the Mummy.
- The Kirby series features the recurring mummy-based enemy Mumbies. It appears to be a floating ball of bandages who follows the player character when he or she looks the opposite direction. The series later has another mummy enemy named Mummbon in Kirby Mass Attack.
- The Mario franchise has different mummies:
  - The video games Luigi's Mansion: Dark Moon and Luigi's Mansion 3 have mummies that are enemies. They are depicted as ghosts who are wrapped in mummy tape. The ghost Serpci in Luigi's Mansion 3 is the mummy of an ancient pharaoh.
- The video game Captain Toad: Treasure Tracker features mummy versions of Toads called Mummy-Me.
- In the Age of Mythology video games, the Mummies are part of the Egyptian faction's Myth Units and are associated with Osiris.
- The Warcraft franchise has mummies that are part of the Scourge. These mummies are mummified versions of creatures from other races that are reanimated through necromancy. The Trolls and the nerubians are known to mummify their dead.
- The video game Moe Chronicle features an unnamed female mummy.
- In the game MediEvil, mummies are enemies that Sir Dan must kill. In its sequel MediEvil 2, there is a blue-skinned mummy named Princess Kiya who is Dan's love interest.
- In the fighting game Killer Instinct, there is an immortal mummy named Kan-Ra.
- The Legend of Zelda features recurrent mummy-like enemies called Gibdo. The Legend of Zelda: Twilight Princess featured an enemy known as a ReDead Knight, which combined features from Gibdo and ReDeads (another undead enemy from the series).
- Mummified versions of different humanoid races, such as humans, dwarves and elves, appear as enemies in NetHack.
- In Minecraft, there are mummy-related zombies known as Husks.
- In Heroes of Might and Magic 3, Mummies are neutral creatures.
- In Plants vs. Zombies 2: It's About Time, there are zombie mummies that live in ancient Egypt.

== Games and toys ==
- In the Dungeons & Dragons role-playing game, there are mummies that are undead creatures and sometimes playable characters throughout its editions and come in various types like Bog Mummies, Clay Mummies, Greater Mummies, Hunefers, Ice Mummies, Mummy Lords, and Salt Mummies. They are based on the creature from Gothic fiction, and are a typical denizen of the Ravenloft setting.
- In the Warhammer tabletop game, the Tomb Kings were the mummified rulers of Nehekhara, the Land of the Dead, who commanded vast armies of skeletons and constructs.
- Mummy: The Resurrection, a 2001 role-playing game by White Wolf Game Studios, allows players to take on the role of resurrected mummies in the modern world, as part of the World of Darkness setting.
- Lego is shown to have different Mummy minifigures:
  - Lego Minifigures is shown to have a Mummy as part of its series three. This Mummy later appeared in The Lego Movie; he is among the Master Builders that convene in Cloud Cuckoo Land.
  - Lego Monster Fighters features The Mummy who roams the desert roads of the Monster Realm at night on his chariot pulled by fire-eyed skeleton horse. This Mummy later appeared in The Lego Batman Movie. He alongside Lord Vampyre and the Swamp Creature appear as inmates of the Phantom Zone.
  - Lego Pharaoh's Quest features the Mummy of Amset-Ra, a Mummy Warrior, a Flying Mummy, and a Snake Charmer Mummy. The minifigures for the Mummy of Amset-Ra and a Mummy Warrior have double-sided heads.
- In the Monster High franchise, Cleo de Nile and Nefera de Nile are known mummies who are the daughters of the mummy Ramses de Nile.
- In the Masters of the Universe Classics toyline, there is a mummy villain named Wrap Trap who is enthralled to the Evil Horde.

== See also ==
- Yummy Mummy Cereal
