= Blood & Chocolate (disambiguation) =

Blood & Chocolate is a 1986 album by Elvis Costello and the Attractions.

Blood & Chocolate may also refer to:

- Blood and Chocolate (novel), a 1997 supernatural werewolf novel by Annette Curtis Klause
- Blood & Chocolate (film), a 2007 film based on the novel
  - The soundtrack for the film
