= Tico Zamora =

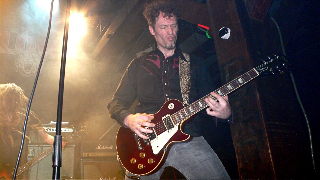

Background information
- Born: Torcuato Zamora; November 15, 1967 (age 58); Washington D.C., US
- Genres: Rock, punk rock, hardcore punk, heavy metal, hard rock
- Occupations: Musician, songwriter, record producer
- Instrument: Guitar
- Years active: 1985–present
- Labels: Wea, WEA

Torcuato Zamora (born 1967), better known as Tico Zamora, is a rock musician, songwriter and record producer.

== History ==
Tico Zamora began playing guitar at an early age. Starting at the age of eight, he received daily guitar lessons from his father, Torcuato Zamora, Sr., an accomplished flamenco guitarist from Almeria, Spain. After five years of apprenticeship with his father, at age 13, the young Zamora bought his first electric guitar, a Fender Stratocaster. Zamora was greatly influenced by his older sister's record collection, which included bands such as Led Zeppelin, Jimi Hendrix, The Beatles and Aerosmith. Through countless hours of playing along with and emulating what he heard on those seminal records, he discovered his passion for the electric guitar. Too young to play in nightclubs, his first performance was at a Battle of the Bands in a local Washington, D.C. area game room where he won the competition. Shortly thereafter, he was asked to join H.R. ("Human Rights"), fronted by Paul Hudson, lead singer of the influential hardcore punk band Bad Brains. This was 16-year-old Zamora's introduction to the world of punk rock.

After touring and recording in the studio with H.R. for two years, H.R.'s former band, Bad Brains, went back into the studio with its original band members and released a new album, I Against I. In 1987, Zamora moved to Athens, Georgia to start a new band, Gypsy Cab Company, and immerse himself in the thriving alternative rock and new wave music scene. Two years later, Maureen Tucker, drummer for The Velvet Underground, asked Zamora to play guitar with her in the opening act for Lou Reed on his New York tour across the U.S. and Canada. In 1990, Zamora played guitar in Mo Tucker's band and toured throughout many cities in Europe, including Berlin, Germany, where Zamora lived from 1991 to 2009.

In Berlin, Zamora set up a recording studio and played with and produced many bands, some of which were part of the exploding electropop/electroclash music scene occurring in Berlin in the early 2000s.

== Credits ==
Tico Zamora has played guitar with H.R. and Maureen Tucker. He has produced and played guitar and other instruments with various Berlin-based bands including Jingo de Lunch, Jan Josef Liefers, Jasmin Tabatabai, Mignon and Electrocute.

His songs have been featured in movies such as HBO's Iron Jawed Angels, and Blood and Chocolate. Zamora has composed theme music for German television news and talk shows including Arabella Kiesbauer, Liebe Sünde, Nicole, Taff, and Bizz.

== Personal life ==
From 2003 to 2008, Tico Zamora was married to the German actress Jasmin Tabatabai. Their only child, Angelina Sherri Rose, was born on December 3, 2002.

== Discography ==
=== Albums ===
- H.R. (Keep out of Reach) (1986)
- Trash Boom Bang (12") Rubber And Fur Trans Solar 2003
- Into The Future (7") Trans Solar 2006
- I Ran (CD, Album) Tomorrow I'll Be Gone,... Chet Records 2007
- What Is It All About? (Album) ◄ (2 versions) Little Teddy Recordings 1994
- Sitting on Snaps (Album) ◄ (2 versions) Matador 1995
- Time's A Great Healer (CD, Single) Wea 1995
- Voyage Voyage (12") Journal International 1995
- A Tribute To Your Taste (CD, EP) Kleiner Dicker Junge (... Emperor Norton 2003
- Trost (CD) I See Cathedrals FM 4.5.1 2004
- Das Mandolinenorchester" (CD, Album, Dig) Mund Auf Augen Zu (Ste... Monika Enterprise 2005
- I Ran (CD, Album)
