= Silver Wolf =

Silver Wolf may refer to:

- The Silver Wolf, a 1993 novel by Alice Borchardt
- Masato (kickboxer), who has used the nickname "Silver Wolf"
- Omar Atlas, a wrestler who has used the nickname "Buddy Silver Wolf"
- Chōzunō Silver Wolf, a manga by Yōzaburō Kanari
- Silver Wolf (film), a 1999 TV film
- Silver Wolf (Honkai: Star Rail), a character in the video game
- Silver Wolf, a deity in BNA: Brand New Animal
- The Synthetic beast Silver Wolf (Chimera), a character in Fate/strange Fake

== See also ==
- Silver Wolf Award
