= Lot No. 249 =

1892 short story by Arthur Conan Doyle

- Short story by Arthur Conan Doyle
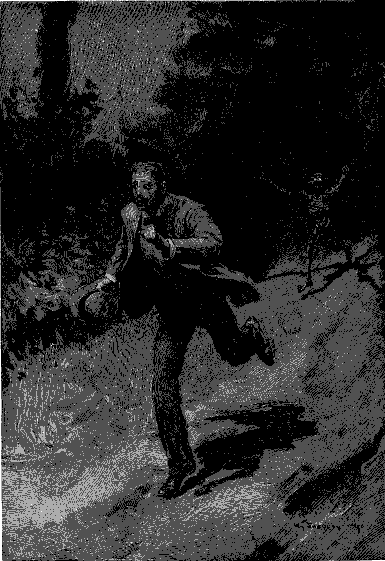
- Illustration by William Thomas Smedley for the original publication of "Lot No. 249"
- Country: Scotland
- Language: English
- Genre: Gothic horror

Publication
- Published in: Harper's Magazine
- Media type: Print (Periodical)
- Publication date: September 1892

"Lot No. 249" is a Gothic horror short story by British writer Arthur Conan Doyle, first published in Harper's Magazine in 1892. The story tells of a University of Oxford athlete named Abercrombie Smith who notices a strange series of events surrounding Edward Bellingham, an Egyptology student who owns many ancient Egyptian artefacts, including a mummy. After seeing his mummy disappear and reappear, and two instances of Bellingham's enemies being attacked, Smith concludes that Bellingham is re-animating his mummy.

Written during a period of great European interest in Egyptian culture known as Egyptomania, "Lot No. 249" was inspired by Doyle's interests in the supernatural, crime and Egyptology. Though re-animated mummies had previously appeared in English literature, Doyle's story was the first to portray one as dangerous. The story has been widely anthologised and received positive reviews from critics, including praise from authors H. P. Lovecraft and Anne Rice. Critics have compared the story to the writings of Edgar Allan Poe and H. Rider Haggard and interpreted it as containing themes of imperialism and masculinity. "Lot No. 249" has been adapted for film and television, and has significantly influenced subsequent media that depicts mummies, as well as other works of horror fiction.

== Synopsis ==
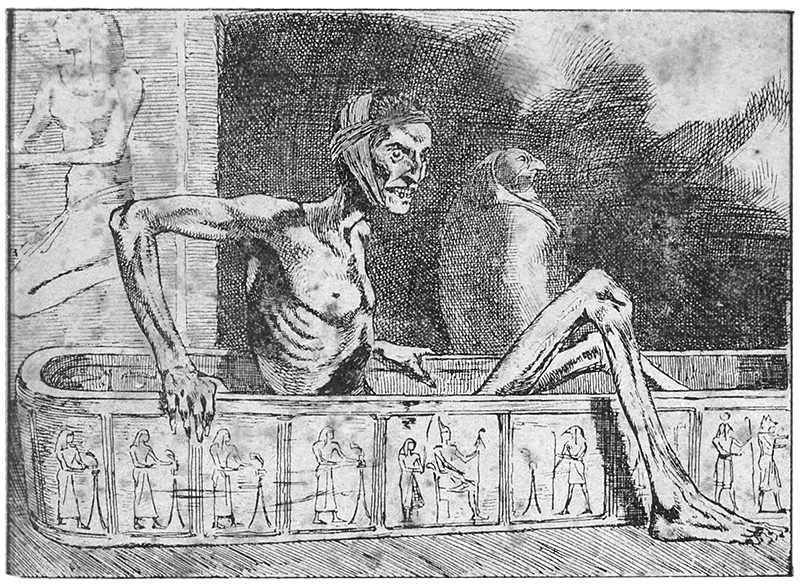
An illustration of the mummy from "Lot No. 249" by Martin van Maële.

In 1884, Abercrombie Smith, an athlete and medical student at the University of Oxford, is called to the rooms of his neighbour and fellow student Edward Bellingham. Bellingham, a fanatical Egyptology student who owns many ancient Egyptian artefacts, has fainted from a severe shock. As Smith uses his medical skills to revive Bellingham, Bellingham's friend William Monkhouse Lee (to whose sister Bellingham is engaged) explains that Bellingham has a curious obsession with an Egyptian mummy that he purchased from an auction sale. Bellingham keeps the mummy in his room, and has named it "Lot 249," as those were the words the auctioneers put on its case.

Over the next few weeks, Smith is frequently disturbed by the sound of mumbling and muttering from Bellingham's room. The building's caretaker, Thomas Styles, confides in Smith that he has heard something walking around Bellingham's room while Bellingham is out. Shortly afterwards, a student called Long Norton, against whom Bellingham bears a long-standing feud, is violently attacked by a mysterious and seemingly inhuman figure. Suspecting Bellingham is connected with the assault, Smith vows to avoid his neighbour entirely.

Not long afterwards, Monkhouse Lee issues a warning to Smith against Bellingham. He explains that he has called off his sister's engagement to Bellingham, after Bellingham confided in him a terrible secret about which he has sworn to keep silent. Later, when passing Bellingham's room, Smith witnesses the mummy seemingly vanish and inexplicably re-appear in its sarcophagus.

After discovering that Lee has been attacked in a similar manner to Norton, Smith concludes that Bellingham has brought the mummy to life and is sending it to attack people who angered him. Smith confronts Bellingham angrily about the attack on Lee, but Bellingham denies any involvement. The following evening, Smith is pursued by the mummy while strolling along a dark country path. Fleeing in terror, he narrowly escapes the creature. He realises that his own life is now in danger and he must take action to stop Bellingham's madness. The next day Smith enters Bellingham's room and forces him at gunpoint to burn the mummy and all items associated with its animation. Once everything has been destroyed, Smith vows to return if Bellingham attempts any such activity again. Bellingham quits the university immediately and flees to Sudan.

== Background ==
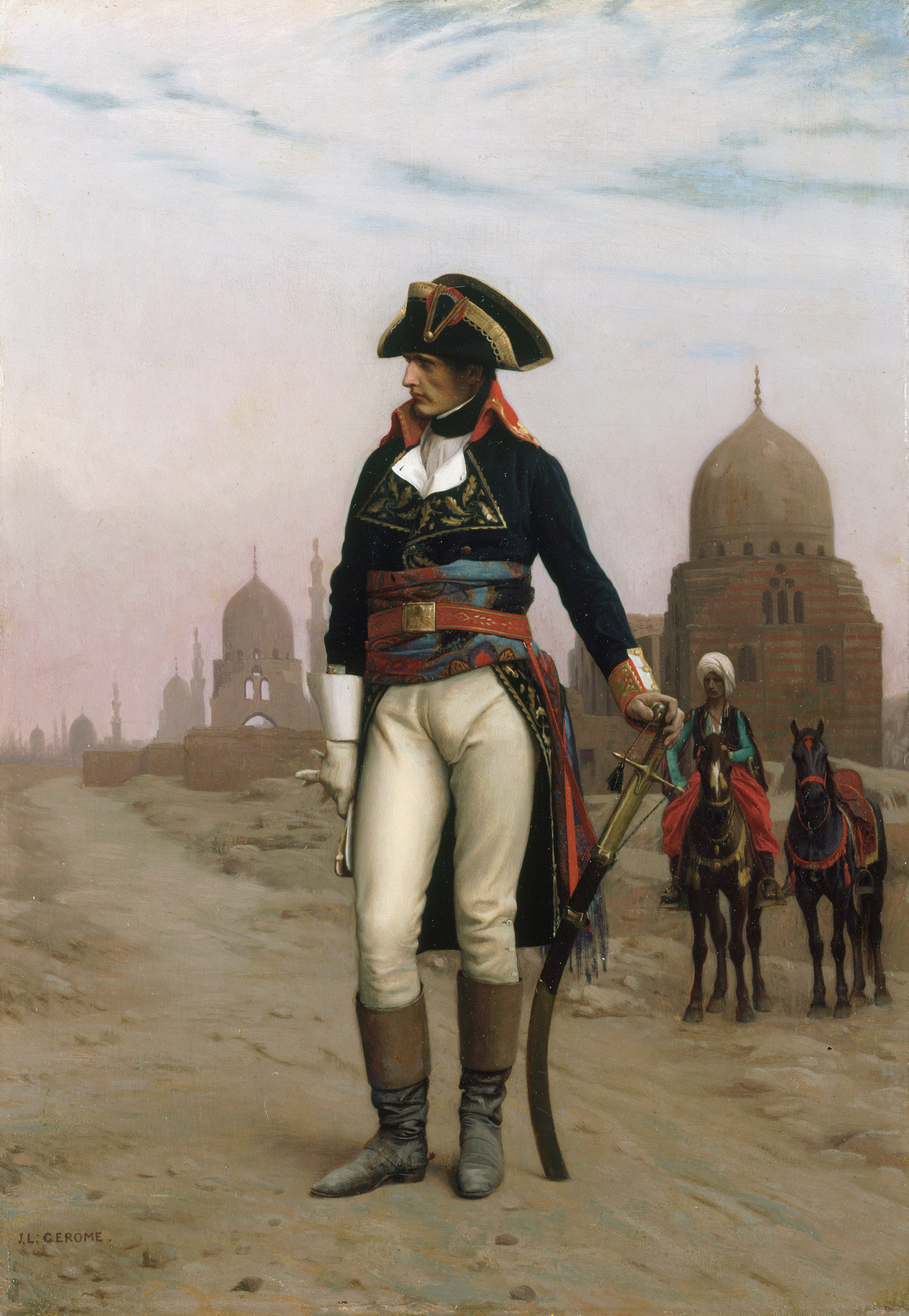
Napoleon's Egyptian campaign (1798–1801) inspired Egyptomania.

During the nineteenth-century, Napoleon's Egyptian campaign (1798–1801), combined with the translation of the Rosetta Stone, led many Europeans to become fascinated with Egyptian art, architecture, science and religion, a fascination that became known as Egyptomania. Egyptomania caused mummies to become an "enduring theme in Western fiction". In his Horror Literature through History: An Encyclopedia of the Stories that Speak to Our Deepest Fears: Volume 1, Matt Cardin contextualises "Lot No. 249" as an example of Egyptomania. In the early 1880s, the mummy of Ramses II, widely believed to be the Pharaoh of the Exodus, was discovered, and the British occupied Egypt with their military. These two events sparked a late Victorian era "fascination with the Egyptian undead," popularised by H. Rider Haggard's novel Cleopatra (1889). Sir Arthur Conan Doyle was motivated to write "Lot No. 249" due to his interest in the supernatural, crime, and Egyptology.

"Lot. No. 249" was not the first work of English literature to include a re-animated mummy; that distinction goes to Jane Webb's The Mummy! (1827), a science fiction novel strongly influenced by Mary Shelley's Frankenstein (1818). Other works of literature about mummies that pre-date "Lot No. 249" are "Some Words with a Mummy" (1845), a short story by Edgar Allan Poe, and Doyle's own short story "The Ring of Thoth" (1890). What separates "Lot No. 249" from previous literary depictions of re-animated mummies was that Doyle portrayed its mummy as dangerous. Richard Bleiler writes in Mummies around the World: An Encyclopaedia of Mummies in History, Religion and Popular Culture that Doyle drew from "contemporary archaeological discoveries in Egypt" while writing the story, but not from any literary model. However, Rafe McGregor writes that "Lot No. 249" has an atmosphere reminiscent of Poe's "The Murders in the Rue Morgue" (1841), a story which Doyle loved. McGregor also hypothesises that the comparison of the mummy to an ape in "Lot No. 249" could be a direct reference to Poe's story. Matt Cardin, however, views "Lot No. 249" as simply using a "standard" mystery structure. Roger Luckhurst identifies Doyle's story as a work of Gothic fiction which resurrects earlier Gothic tropes of "revenge, inheritance, and the consequences of possession". The story was first published in Harper's Magazine in September 1892 and was included in Doyle's medical-themed anthology Round the Red Lamp (1894).

== Themes ==
=== Imperialism ===
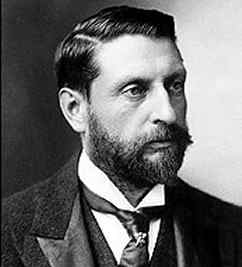
"Lot No. 249" has often been compared to the novels of H. Rider Haggard.

Near the end of the nineteenth-century, many British people felt that Britain was in decline due to a belief that the world was morally and culturally degenerating even as the British Empire expanded. This fear, captured in Max Nordau's influential book Degeneration (1892), was aided by the fact that Britain faced economic threats from Europe and the United States. These circumstances led to a sub-genre of Gothic fiction that Emily Adler refers to as the "Imperial Gothic", which is concerned with British fears of being invaded by foreign cultures. Adler cites "Lot. No. 249" and Rider Haggard's novels King Solomon's Mines (1885) and She: A History of Adventure (1887) as examples of this sub-genre. Deaglán Ó Donghaile, however, sees Doyle's story as a critique of imperialism. In Blasted Literature, he writes that "The story calls into question to what extent colonialism, with its absorption of the cultures of the colonised, destabilises the perspective of the imperial, metropolitan subject position. While the process of imperial assimilation is symbolised by the private museum Bellingham keeps in his rooms ... it seems in the end that it is the mummy, and not Bellingham, who is in control."

=== Masculinity ===
Rafe McGregor notes that Abercrombie Smith is a stereotypical "image of a man's man that Doyle admired, and tried to project of himself" and that many Doyle stories, particularly his works of weird fiction, lack such characters. In Masculinity and the New Imperialism: Rewriting Manhood in British Popular Literature 1870–1914, Bradley Deane writes that the mummy from "Lot No. 249" is one of the first fictional mummies to be presented as a "masculine competitor". Deane opines that some earlier works of British popular literature, like She, characterised the British as masculine and their enemies as feminine; he feels that Doyle subverted this expectation by making the mummy a "male, mindless but strong and swift [figure] who threatens to defeat a young Oxford athlete in a terrifying footrace." Deane argues that the lack of a masculine/feminine distinction between Smith and the mummy "suggests a darker fragmentation of identity and an emasculating reversal of the imperial hierarchy."

== Critical reception ==
Rudyard Kipling said that the short story gave him his first nightmare in years. In his essay "Supernatural Horror in Literature" (1927), H. P. Lovecraft writes that: "Doyle now and then struck a powerfully spectral note, as in 'The Captain of the Pole-Star', a tale of arctic ghostliness, and 'Lot No. 249', where the re-animated mummy theme is used with more than ordinary skill." Anne Rice called the story "great". David Stuart Davies enjoyed the subtlety of Doyle's prose and the tale's "growing sense of horror and unreality," adding that Doyle "carried on the tradition of the great ghost story writers ... by allowing the reader's own imagination to enhance the misty picture painted by the writer." Rafe McGregor writes in The Conan Doyle Weirdbook that "Lot No. 249" "remains a highly entertaining – not to mention spine-tingling – weird tale." McGregor adds that, thanks to "Lot No. 249" and his other contributions to the genre, Doyle should be seen as a master of weird fiction. Andrew Barger said that

"Not only does this excellent mummy story need more visibility, this Doyle spinetingler is one of the best horror short stories for the last half of the nineteenth century."

In a mixed review, Richard Bleiler praises the tale's "narrative vigor" and "brisk" pace. However, he also feels that it is a minor work of Victorian literature remembered primarily due to its author and subject matter, and is neither Doyle's best work nor the best work of fiction involving re-animated mummies.

== Adaptations ==
The story is a possible influence for the lost short film Robbing Cleopatra's Tomb (1899). The tale was adapted into a 1967 television production for the BBC programme Sir Arthur Conan Doyle, as well as the lead segment from Tales from the Darkside: The Movie (1990). The Tales from the Darkside segment contains slapstick and slasher film elements. According to Mark Browning's Stephen King on the Big Screen, the "mummy horror sub-genre" was "largely played out" by the time the film was made. An adaptation of the story, Lot No. 249, was made for the BBC and aired on Christmas Eve 2023.

== Legacy ==
"Lot No. 249" has been widely anthologised, and its titular mummy has become an icon of horror. Rafe McGregor writes in The Conan Doyle Weirdbook that "Lot No. 249" is "One of the most significant [stories] in the history of supernatural fiction [for] being the first to depict a re-animated mummy as a sinister, dangerous creature." It was also the first work of fiction to feature a modern man reviving a mummy with ancient Egyptian texts as opposed to electricity. Emily Adler notes that Doyle's story pre-dates Bram Stoker's Dracula (1897) and Richard Marsh's The Beetle (1897) in its portrayal of foreign monsters invading Britain. McGregor identifies the short story as a significant influence on other mummy-related media, such as Stoker's novel The Jewel of Seven Stars (1903) and the Boris Karloff film The Mummy (1932), as well as zombie fiction. Bradley Deane feels that the masculinity of Kharis from The Mummy franchise as played by Lon Chaney Jr. was inspired by Doyle's story, while Matthew Coniam feels that Hammer Film Productions' The Mummy (1959) draws from the atmosphere of "Lot No. 249". Anne Rice cited "Lot No. 249" and "The Ring of Thoth" as inspirations for her novel, The Mummy, or Ramses the Damned (1989), which she dedicated to Doyle.

== See also ==
- Arthur Conan Doyle bibliography

== Sources ==
- Barger, Andrew (2016), Best Horror Short Stories 1850-1899: A 6a66le Horror Anthology, United States of America: Bottletree Books LLC, ISBN 978-1-933747-57-6
- Browning, Mark (2009), Stephen King on the Big Screen, Chicago, USA: Intellectual, Ltd., ISBN 978-1-84150-327-1
- Cardin, Matt (2017), Horror Literature through History: An Encyclopedia of the Stories that Speak to Our Deepest Fears: Volume 1, Santa Barbara, California: Greenwood, ISBN 978-1-4408-4756-1
- Cardin, Matt (2015), Mummies around the World: An Encyclopedia of Mummies in History, Religion and Popular Culture, Santa Barbara, California: ABC-CLIO, ISBN 978-1-61069-419-3
- Coniam, Matthew (2017), Egyptomania Goes to the Movies: From Archaeology to Popular Craze to Hollywood Fantasy, Jefferson, North Carolina and London: McFarland & Company, ISBN 978-1-4766-2986-5
- Davies, David Stuart (2004), Return from the Dead: A Collection of Classic Mummy Stories, Hertfordshire: Wordsworth's Editions Limited, ISBN 1-84022-452-5
- Deane, Bradley (2014), Masculinity and the New Imperialism: Rewriting Manhood in British Popular Literature, 1870-1914, Cambridge, United Kingdom: Cambridge University Press, ISBN 978-1-107-06607-6
- Doyle, Arthur Conan (2010), The Conan Doyle Weirdbook, Birmingham: Theaker's Paperback Library, ISBN 978-0-9561533-2-6
- Hughes, William; Punter, David; Smith, Andrew (2016), The Encyclopedia of the Gothic, Chinchester, West Sussex: Wiley-Blackwell, ISBN 978-1-119-06460-2
- Luckhurst, Roger (2005), Late Victorian Gothic Tales, Oxford World's Classics, Oxford, United Kingdom: Oxford University Press, ISBN 978-0-199-53887-4
- Ó Donghaile, Deaglán (2011), Blasted Literature: Victorian Political Fiction and the Shock of Modernism, Edinburg: Edinburgh University Press, ISBN 978-0-7486-4067-6
- Schablitsky, Julie (2007), Box Office Archaeology, Left Coast Press, ISBN 978-1598740561
- Thornton, Amara (2018), Archaeologists in Print: Publishing for the People, London: University College London Press, ISBN 978-1-78735-260-5
- van Heerden, Bill (1998), Film and Television In-Jokes: Nearly 2,000 Intentional References, Parodies and Homages, Jefferson, North Carolina and London: McFarland & Company, ISBN 978-0-7864-3894-5
