= William Arnold Newton =

American actor (1965–1990)

- Born: July 26, 1965; Eau Claire, Wisconsin, U.S.
- Died: October 29, 1990 (aged 25); Los Angeles, California
- Occupations: Actor, beautician
- Partner: Terry Elliott

William Arnold Newton (July 26, 1965 – October 29, 1990) was an American gay pornographic actor. He performed in films under the name Billy London and Billy Porter and produced gay pornographic films under the name Bill E. London. Newton's gruesome murder was regularly featured in articles listing the most notorious, unsolved Hollywood homicides. In 2023, the case was solved and Newton's killer was identified as Daralyn Madden.

== Early life ==
Newton was born in Eau Claire, Wisconsin. He attended grade school and junior high school in Eau Claire before moving to Ladysmith, Wisconsin in 1979. Newton and his mother moved to Oklahoma City after Newton's first year of high school in 1980. At the time of his murder, Newton's family told the Leader-Telegram newspaper Newton moved to California in 1984 and was doing makeup and choreography for a company that made music videos. Newton's father Richard Harriman told the Leader-Telegram, "[Newton] was a very intelligent young man...He had a lot of things going his way the last year or two. He was just starting to make a life for himself. He was starting to get into something where he was making a good living." But Harriman went on to describe his son as a "restless kid" who was "trying to find himself. He wanted to get out of California for a while". He left home at age 16 and traveled around the United States for three years before settling in Los Angeles in 1985. He received his GED from the L.A. Unified School District in 1989. Newton's friends describe him as somebody who saw himself much more of a poet and an illustrative artist and only did adult material for economic reasons.

== Adult film career ==
While working at the Hollywood Spa, a gay bathhouse in Los Angeles, Newton met adult film producer David Rey, who helped him land roles in several gay erotic videos.

Newton and Rey eventually became lovers and established London-Rey Productions in 1987. Newton began working at London-Rey as a movie producer, make-up artist and set designer under the name Bill E. London. Before going to L.A. he lived in Oklahoma City, Oklahoma, with his partner Terry Elliott, where he earned his beautician license. Elliot still resides there.

By October 1990, Newton had plans to leave Los Angeles and move to Las Vegas.

== Death ==
Newton was murdered shortly after completing what would be his last film, The Grip of Passion. He was last seen alive at Rage Nightclub in West Hollywood, the gay epicenter of Los Angeles. Newton's dismembered body was discovered by a transient in a dumpster in West Hollywood, CA on the following day, October 30. Only Newton's head and arm were discovered in plastic bags, said his father, Richard Harriman of Eau Claire, Wisconsin. At the time of his murder, LAPD detective Ron Veneman told the Eau Claire Leader-Telegram in Eau Claire, Wisconsin, "We have several leads we're working on but nothing that is solid yet. We have other information we're not at liberty to give out." His murder remained unsolved for 32 years until a break in the case identified Daralyn Madden as Newton's murderer. Madden, a white supremacist, confessed to the killing after an amateur sleuth made the connection following months of investigating Newton's case. Madden was already serving two life sentences: One for the murder of Bradley Qualls, who was also her accomplice in the murder of Steven Dormer.

== 2005 reinvestigation ==
In 2005, Detective Wendi Berndt announced that she was re-investigating the case, hoping that advances in technology might help to solve the murder. Berndt told adult entertainment journalist Mickey Skee she was one of the original detectives on the case but had been assigned to different divisions over the years as the case went unsolved. When Berndt became supervisor of the LAPD Homicide Unit, Hollywood division, she made significant outreach to the media regarding the Newton murder, citing the fact that she had never forgotten the crime. On Saturday, October 29, the 15th anniversary of Newton's murder, Fox 11 reporter Tony Valdez met with Berndt and visited the crime scene. However, in December 2006, reporter Mickey Skee reported that Newton's father, Richard Harriman, contacted him saying that the LAPD had put the investigation of his son's murder "on the back burner." He left an e-mail address, where he could be contacted. As of April 2016, the address does not work. The June 2, 2011, edition of the Leader-Telegram in Eau Claire lists an obituary for a Richard "Dick" Hollice Harriman who was pre-deceased by a son named William. It states that Harriman died at his residence "in the presence of his loving family and friends".

== 30th anniversary ==
As the 30th anniversary of Newton's unsolved murder approached in 2020, podcasters and New York Times bestselling authors Christopher Rice and Eric Shaw Quinn covered the case on Episode 37 of their podcast "TDPS Presents CHRISTOPHER & ERIC" and established an e-mail address dedicated to tips and information. In Episode 48 of their podcast they were the first to reveal the account of a potential eyewitness who claimed to have been among the last people to see William Newton alive at the night club Rage in West Hollywood. This eyewitness also asserted that Newton left the night club in the company of a man who bore a striking resemblance to the serial killer Jeffrey Dahmer, who would be arrested the following year for a string of serial murders, many of them involving dismembered gay men, in Milwaukee, Wisconsin.

In January 2021, the LAPD Homicide Detective in charge of Newton's case contacted Rice and Quinn as a result of their podcasts about the crime. In February 2021, another episode of the podcast aired, with the detective who inherited the case giving an interview. On April 25, 2021, director Rachel Mason appeared on the same podcast, revealing that she was working on a documentary about the case.

== Videography ==
=== As Billy London ===
- Bulge
- Hard Choices
- Head of the Class
- Hot Wired
- Imperfect Strangers
- Sex Drive 2020
- In the Grip of Passion

=== As Bill E. London ===
- Hard Labor
- Make a Wish ... and Blow
- Swap Meat
- Dream Doll
- Dreamen
- Fantasy Boys
