= Blood & Chocolate (soundtrack) =

Blood & Chocolate: Original Motion Picture Soundtrack

Soundtrack album by Various Artists
- Released: January 26, 2007 (UK); January 23, 2007 (USA)
- Genres: Rock, rap, R&B, doo-wop, funk, disco, trip hop, soul, adult contemporary music
- Label: Lakeshore Records

Blood & Chocolate: Original Motion Picture Soundtrack is the soundtrack for the film Blood & Chocolate, released on January 26, 2007 over Lakeshore Records.

== History ==
The following songs are included on the soundtrack CD, but they can not be heard in the movie. According to Lakeshore Records, the soundtrack album features "exclusive remixes of the Johnny Klimek and Reinhold Heil score as well as an array of original material as well as covers of classic songs inspired by the film".

== Track listing ==
1. "Stripped" - Shiny Toy Guns
2. "A Forest" - Lunar Click
3. "Blood" (Chocolate Version) - Sparklemotion
4. "How Soon Is Now" - Bobby Gold
5. "New Skin" - New Skin
6. "Terrible Lie" (Featuring Ai Kusuhara) - Mercury Falls
7. "Out of City" (Hot Bloody Chocolate Remix) - Johnny Klimek and Reinhold Heil
8. "I Started Something" - Bow Wow Wow
9. "The Killing Moon" (Remix) - The Distants
10. "Haunted When the Minutes Drag" - Collide
11. "Chocolate" - Work
12. "Venus In Furs" - Black Rainbow
13. "Halloween" - Tre Lux
14. "Flesh for Fantasy" - Fiction Company
15. "Love Will Tear Us Apart" - Philistine
16. "Kissing a Wolf" (Zaras Mix) - Johnny Klimek and Reinhold Heil

== Score ==
Blood & Chocolate: Original Motion Picture Score was composed by Johnny Klimek, Reinhold Heil, Gabriel Isaac Mounsey and Bruce Winter.

1. Angels In the Snow
2. Wolf Church
3. Red
4. Gabriel/Heritage
5. The Distillery
6. Wolf Girl
7. The First Hunt
8. Krall's End
9. Wolf Eyes
10. Pack Meets Leader
11. Searching for Vivian
12. Bone Church
13. Rafe & Aidan Fight
14. Rafe's Death
15. Take It, It's Silver
16. You Should Have Left Me
17. My Son Is Dead
18. The Gathering
19. The Second Hunt
20. The Creek
21. The River
22. Vivian Wounded
23. Film Warehouse
24. Kissing a Wolf
25. Run Free Little Girl
26. Pharmacy
27. Vivian Released
28. Distillery Fight
29. Gabriel's End

== Unofficial soundtrack ==
Songs that were featured in the movie. Some of them were remixed and added into the soundtrack.

1. "Garab - Rachid Taha
2. "Let Yourself Go Wild" - Jasmin Tabatabai
3. "Velvet Hills" - Katja Riemann
4. "You Know the Truth" - Aurah
5. "Cash Machine" - Hard-Fi
6. "Amor Fati" - Aurah
7. "Silence Summons You" - The Sofa Club
8. "Eu Te Iubesc Prea Mult" - Nicolae Guță
9. "Stand My Ground" - Within Temptation
