= Klause =

Klause is the name of the following persons

- Annette Curtis Klause (born 1953), American author
- Gert-Dietmar Klause (born 1945), former East German cross-country skier
