= Your Show Time =

- Genre: Anthology Drama
- Written by: Walter Doniger
- Directed by: Sobey Martin
- Presented by: Arthur Shields
- Narrated by: Arthur Shields
- Country of origin: United States
- Original language: English
- No. of seasons: 1
- No. of episodes: 26

Production
- Producers: Marshall Grant; Stanley Rubin
- Running time: 26 mins. (approx)

Original release
- Network: NBC Television
- Release: January 21 – July 15, 1949

Your Show Time is an American anthology drama series that debuted on NBC Television on the East Coast in September 1948 and then on both the East and the West Coast, as a network show, on January 21, 1949.

The show was produced by Marshall Grant/Realm Productions and was hosted by Arthur Shields.

== Production background ==
Filmed by Grant Productions at Hal Roach Studios, Your Show Time was American television's first dramatic series to be shot on film instead of being aired on live television or as a kinescope. The series Public Prosecutor was produced on film in 1947–48, for a planned September 1948 debut, but remained unaired until DuMont aired that series in 1951–52.

In 1949, the number of television sets in American households was till quite small. By shooting on film, it was feasible for the producers to increase their audience with theatrical releases.

The series was sponsored by the American Tobacco Company for Lucky Strike cigarettes.

== Synopsis ==
The show featured half-hour dramatizations of stories by renowned authors such as Guy de Maupassant, Charles Dickens, Arthur Conan Doyle, Victor Hugo, Robert Louis Stevenson, Frank Stockton, and Mark Twain. Other episodes were adapted from chapters of novels, such as The Bishop's Experiment, an adaptation of the section featuring the bishop in Victor Hugo's Les Misérables with Leif Erickson as Jean Valjean. An adaptation of "The Adventure of the Speckled Band" marked one of the earliest known television appearances of Sherlock Holmes.

Each episode opened in an old bookshop where host Arthur Shields was seated behind an old desk, from which he introduced that evening's story.

== Cast ==
The show featured appearances by such actors as Julie Adams, Robert Alda, Evelyn Ankers, Morris Carnovsky, Melville Cooper, Reginald Denny, William Frawley, Eva Gabor, Hurd Hatfield, Hugo Haas, Sterling Holloway, Marjorie Lord, Alan Napier, Dan O'Herlihy, Eve Miller, Gene Reynolds, and Selena Royle.

== Critical reception ==
A review of "The Diamond Necklace" episode in the trade publication Variety found it to be "not good television" and "a dull half-hour." The review noted that a long commercial and a long introduction by the narrator took up almost five minutes before the first dialog was heard. In addition to that "deadly beginning", it said that the rest of the episode offered "little action".

Your Show Time is notable for being the first series to win an Emmy Award. The 1949 episode "The Necklace", produced by Stanley Rubin, won the Emmy Award as Outstanding Made For Television Movie.

== Sale ==
In January 1950 Jerry Fairbanks Inc. bought "full rights for television, films and allied media" for the 26 episodes of Your Show Time.

== Preservation status ==
25 episodes survive at the UCLA Film and Television Archive.

== Episodes ==
No.	Title	Original release date
1	"The Necklace"	January 21, 1949
Adapted from the Guy de Maupassant story Cast : John Beal
2	"The Sire de Maletroit's Door"	January 28, 1949
Adapted from the Robert Louis Stevenson story Cast : Dan O'Herlihy, Morris Carnovsky, Allene Roberts
3	"Mademoiselle Fifi"	February 4, 1949
Adapted from the Guy de Maupassant story Cast : Hurd Hatfield, Roman Bohnen, Jeanne Page, Frank Reicher, Jay Adler, Tannis Chandler
4	"The Mummy's Foot"	February 11, 1949
Adapted from the Theophile Gautier story Cast : Phyllis Coates, Peggy Dow, J. Edward Bromberg, Herbert Anderson, Hand Henry
5	"The Substitute"	February 18, 1949
Cast : Robert Alda, Suzanne Dalbert
6	"The Invisible Wound"	February 25, 1949
Cast : Reginald Denny, Maria Palmer
7	"Capture"	March 4, 1949
Adapted from the Henry C. Bunner story Cast : Jeanne Cagney, Sterling Holloway, Housely Stevenson, Richard Travis
8	"The Real Thing"	March 11, 1949
Adapted from the Henry James story Cast : John Archer, Marjorie Lord
9	"The Treasure of Franchard"	March 18, 1949
Cast : Alan Reed, Selena Royle, Dan Seymour
10	"The Adventure of the Speckled Band"	March 25, 1949
Adapted from the Arthur Conan Doyle story Cast : Alan Napier, Melville Cooper, Evelyn Ankers
11	"The Tenor"	April 1, 1949
Adapted from the Henry C. Bunner story Cast : Hugo Haas, Carol Brennan, Lee Patrick, Betty Adams
12	"The Manchester Marriage"	April 8, 1949
Cast : Jan Clayton, Richard Travis
13	"The Lady, or the Tiger?"	April 15, 1949
Adapted from the Frank Stockton story Cast : Leif Erickson, Eve Miller, William Frawley, Peggy Knudsen
14	"A Confession on New Year's Eve"	April 22, 1949
Cast : John Archer, Stanley Waxman
15	"The Mysterious Picture"	April 29, 1949
Cast : Marc Daniels, Hugo Haas, Mark Stevens
16	"An Old, Old Story"	May 6, 1949
Cast : Eric Blore, Selena Royle
17	"The Marquise"	May 13, 1949
Cast : Elizabeth Fraser, Leif Erickson
18	"The Million Pound Bank Note"	May 20, 1949
Cast : Ross Ford, Paula Raymond
19	"Birthday of the Infants"	May 27, 1949
Cast : } Gene Reynolds, Frank Wilcox, Gloria Holden
20	"Why Thomas Was Discharged"	June 3, 1949
Cast : } Marc Daniels, Marcia Jones, Gil Stratton Jr., Tom Stevenson
21	"The Bishop's Experiment"	June 10, 1949
Cast : } Leif Erickson, Ludwig Donath
22	"The Celebrated Jumping Frog of Calaveras County"	June 17, 1949
Cast : } Kristine Miller, Kirby Grant
23	"An Only Son"	June 24, 1949
Cast : } Richard Crane, Judy Sochor
24	"Colonel Starbottle for the Plaintiff"	July 1, 1949
Adapted from the Bret Harte story Cast : Robert Warwick
25	"Cricket on the Hearth"	July 8, 1949
Adapted from the Charles Dickens story Cast : Heather Wilde, Thomas P. Dillon
26	"A Lodging for the Night"	July 15, 1949
Adapted from the Robert Louis Stevenson story Cast : Stanley Waxman, Eva Gabor

== Awards ==
Year	Award	Result	Category	Notes
1950	Emmy Award	Won	Best Film Made for Television	For episode "The Necklace"

== See also ==
- 1948-49 United States network television schedule
