= The Mummy, or Ramses the Damned =

1989 novel by Anne Rice

The Mummy or Ramses the Damned
- First edition cover
- Author: Anne Rice
- Language: English
- Genre: Horror
- Published: May 6, 1989
- Publisher: Ballantine Books
- Publication place: United States
- Media type: Print (Paperback)
- Pages: 448
- ISBN: 0-345-36000-1 (first edition, paperback)
- OCLC: 19682492
- Dewey Decimal: 813/.54 20
- LC Class: PS3568.I265 M86 1989
- Followed by: Ramses the Damned: The Passion of Cleopatra

The Mummy, or Ramses the Damned is a 1989 horror novel by American writer Anne Rice. Taking place during the early twentieth century, it follows the collision between a British archeologist's family and a resurrected mummy.

The novel ends with the statement, "The Adventures of Ramses the Damned Shall Continue", and twenty-eight years later, Rice fulfilled this promise with Ramses the Damned: The Passion of Cleopatra, written in collaboration with her son, novelist Christopher Rice.

A jointly-authored third novel in this series, Ramses the Damned: The Reign of Osiris, was released on February 1, 2022, two months after Anne Rice's death.

== Plot introduction ==
During the Edwardian period in 1914, a wealthy shipping-magnate-turned-archaeologist, Lawrence Stratford, discovers an unusual tomb. The mummy inside is identified as the pharaoh Ramses II, the most powerful and most celebrated pharaoh in the history of Egypt, despite the tomb's dating only to the first century B.C., 1100 years after the documented death of Ramses II.

Before he can fully investigate this claim, Lawrence unexpectedly falls dead, and those around him fear he was the victim of a curse placed on the tomb. The mummy and other belongings are shipped off to London, and placed on temporary display in Lawrence's house before they are taken by the British Museum.

Lawrence's daughter Julie Stratford is the designated heir to her father's shipping company, as well as the dysfunctional family that surrounds it. Her cousin Henry is an alcoholic and gambling addict who has been draining the family fortune with the aid of his father. Julie is engaged to marry Alex Savarell, a viscount and son of Elliott, the current Earl of Rutherford.

Although the marriage represents a conventional alliance between the wealthy Stratford family and an impoverished noble lineage, Alex harbors genuine affection for Julie; however, she is unable to reciprocate his feelings.

Into this unstable situation comes the mummy Ramses, who awakes shortly after his sarcophagus is placed in Julie's house.

== Plot summary ==
Henry murders his uncle Lawrence with a poison found in the mummy's tomb. When Henry tries to poison Julie in the same manner, Ramses comes to life and attempts to kill Henry, but succeeds only in scaring him away. After his awakening, Julie and Ramses are instantly attracted to each other. Ramses quickly adopts a pseudonym, "Reginald Ramsey", and claims to be an Egyptologist to throw off the accusation made by the frightened Henry that a "bloody mummy" rose from the crypt to harm him. With superhuman intelligence and the ability to learn quickly, Ramses quickly learns the English language and, with the help of an eager Julie, is given a tour of modern London and new technology that had arisen during the past two thousand years. While Henry's accusations are passed off as the rantings of a drunkard, the elderly and ailing Elliott Savarell suspects that it may be the truth. He trails Ramses and comes to believe that he is who Henry claims him to be.

During Ramses's reign as pharaoh, he had learned from a Hittite priestess the formula for an elixir that grants eternal life. The potion not only made him immortal, but also allows his body to regenerate from damage that would kill a normal human, such as multiple bullet wounds. He requires neither food nor drink nor sleep, and only the sun's rays to maintain his life. However, he still craves food and certain other physical pleasures, like sex, smoking, and alcohol.

Ramses nurses a deep secret. Prior to the Roman conquest of Egypt, he had served as an immortal advisor to its kings and queens, and the last person to awake him for consultation had been Cleopatra, the last ruler of Egypt. Although he served as Cleopatra's counsel (and encouraged her to romance Julius Caesar in a bid to keep the country independent), he had also fallen in love with her, and had revealed to her the secrets of the elixir. Having fallen in love with Mark Antony in defiance of Ramses's advice, Cleopatra refuses the elixir and chooses suicide upon Antony's death. In his depression, Ramses had given himself the name "Ramses the Damned", and had Egyptian priests seal him away underground.

With Julie's encouragement, Ramses begins to recover. While Henry is convinced that Ramses is an evil monster ready to kill the entire family, Elliott reads Lawrence's notes and chases after Ramses to learn the secret of the elixir of immortality. Eventually, Ramses and Julie decide to visit Egypt one last time so that Ramses can say good-bye to his past. Although Ramses appears to be coming to terms with his past, upon visiting the Cairo Museum, he unexpectedly recognizes an unidentified mummy as being that of Cleopatra. Breaking into the museum later at night simply to see her, he impulsively pours some of the elixir onto the dead body. Cleopatra is revived, but by Ramses not pouring the entire vial of elixir on her, the restoration is incomplete; she is a half-formed monstrosity, awake and conscious yet with parts of her face, hands, and torso still gone. Her incomplete brain restoration leaves her not totally coherent; though Ramses later repairs her body with more of the potion, she appears to be insane and kills a number of people, including Henry. Cleopatra unexpectedly falls in love with Elliot's son Alex though realizes a life with him cannot last because of his mortality and his innocence. Because Ramses would not give her long-ago love Mark Antony the elixir to save his life, Cleopatra holds a passionate hatred for him and seeks to even the score by killing his current love: Julie Stratford.

Cleopatra ultimately hesitates before killing Julie, recognizing that the young woman should not be held accountable for Ramses's actions. She also begins to regret the other murders she has committed. In an effort to flee from Ramses, Cleopatra “dies” when her car is struck by a train and engulfed in a fiery explosion intense enough to “kill even an immortal.” Later, Ramses gives the elixir to Julie after she attempts suicide in her grief over losing him, and he vows to remain with her for eternity. To thank him for his help in covering up all the unusual events, Ramses also gives the elixir to a dying Elliott, who drinks it after serious consideration of the consequences: dying miserably, or living eternally even when wishing for nothing but oblivion. Cleopatra has secretly survived the crash, and awakens under the care of a British doctor in Sudan. She vows to find Ramses again someday for revenge.

== Development ==
The Mummy was originally a film script by Rice, who said producers "wanted to change everything." She explained, "I think I went off to create that book just to spite them, I was so furious."

== Major themes ==
Like the vampires of Rice's Vampire Chronicles, those who take the elixir become immortal, inhumanly strong, and unable to die from normal means. These individuals could even be said to be "reverse vampires" since they derive their strength from the sun, and cannot live without it. Unlike vampires, they are able to eat, drink and function as normal humans. However, this immortality comes with a strange price. Those who drink the potion are constantly driven to sate their senses. They constantly crave food and drink, although they need neither to survive. They have an extremely heightened libido. Moreover, their bodies continually blunt drugs that give humans pleasure. For example, Ramses constantly drinks and smokes because the "buzz" the alcohol or nicotine would normally give him fades after a few moments.

Perhaps most significantly, the elixir renders any organic substance invulnerable and self-sustaining. In his own time, Ramses had tested it on livestock and crops, only to be horrified by the results: once transformed, such matter could not be digested and would continually regenerate even within the intestines, producing gruesome and bloody consequences. Moreover, once applied, the effects of the elixir are irreversible. If poured into a fire, it would reduce to dust that, when carried by rain into rivers or oceans, could create immortal fish and sea creatures, or—when absorbed by soil—invulnerable plants. As a result, the only means of disposal is deliberate consumption. For this reason, Ramses keeps the elixir's formula a closely guarded secret, despite its ingredients being both common and easily obtainable. His conflict with Cleopatra, prior to the events of the novel, began when he refused her demand to create an “immortal army” for Mark Antony.

As with many Rice novels, sexuality tends to be fluid. Both Elliott and Lawrence are described as bisexual—when younger, they were lovers, but both eventually married and had children. In the past, Henry had an affair with Elliott as well, but his only reason may have been a failed blackmail attempt, as at the time of the novel, Henry has at least two mistresses.

As always, Rice employs considerable irony. For example, after his death, Henry's corpse ends up in a "mummy factory" (during the Egyptian craze of the early 1900s, natives often took modern corpses and made them into mummies for sale to gullible tourists). Elliott, his nemesis, gets the last laugh when a merchant tries to sell him Henry's mummy.

== Allusions and references to other works ==
Rice credited the authors of several turn of the century mummy stories with her inspiration, including Arthur Conan Doyle ("Lot No. 249" and "The Ring of Thoth"), H. Rider Haggard (She), and "All who have brought 'the mummy' to life in stories, novels and film." England during the late-nineteenth and early-twentieth centuries fell under a fad for Ancient Egypt, a phenomenon also known as Egyptomania which produced many works of fiction from which Rice could draw. It has been argued that William Shakespeare's Antony and Cleopatra, as well as other popular culture representations of Cleopatra, have a discernible influence on Rice's novel.

== Reception ==
Publishers Weekly called the novel "an uneasy marriage of romance and horror... marinated in sentimentality, melodrama and absurdity... Missing a ripe opportunity to skewer 20th-century values and sexual mores, [Rice], ever-fascinated with the undead, avoids character and plot development, larding largely lifeless, sloppy prose with a surfeit of epiphanies and calamities."

== Sequels ==
During a 2014 interview, Rice stated that she had delved back into the fictional universe established in The Mummy and that there was a strong possibility she could pen a sequel. In February 2017, Rice announced a new Ramses novel, co-written with her son, novelist Christopher Rice. Ramses the Damned: The Passion of Cleopatra was published on November 21, 2017. A jointly-authored third novel in this series, Ramses the Damned: The Reign of Osiris, was released on February 1, 2022, two months after Anne Rice's death.
