= The Dragon Queen =

2001 novel by Alice Borchardt

The Dragon Queen: The Tales of Guinevere
- First edition
- Author: Alice Borchardt
- Cover artist: Scott McKowen
- Language: English
- Genre: Historical novel
- Published: 2001 (Del Rey)
- Publication place: USA
- Media type: Print (paperback)
- Pages: 473
- ISBN: 9780345443991
- OCLC: 824183589
- Followed by: The Raven Warrior

The Dragon Queen (ISBN 0-553-81512-1) is a 2001 fantasy novel by Alice Borchardt based on the legend of King Arthur. The story is set in the Dark Ages and follows a young girl called Guinevere who has inherited magical powers.

== Synopsis ==
The story is sited in Britain just after the Romans have gone. Guinevere is the daughter of a pagan queen. Forced into hiding by the dreaded sorcerer Merlin, Guinevere grows up under the protection of a shapeshifter and a druid and is watched over by dragons.

Merlin tracks her down relentlessly, intent on stopping what has been foretold, that she will become Queen and Arthur King; a fate that will leave him powerless and forgotten. To Merlin's dismay, Guinevere has inherited magical powers great enough to stop him. With Arthur trapped in the netherworld, Guinevere calls upon magic and allies and undertakes her destiny: to one day become the Dragon Queen.

== Reception ==
The Publishers Weekly review was favorable, stating "Borchardt ... paints a vivid portrait of the future queen, who is no pale Pre-Raphaelite princess" and "Borchardt further stakes her claim as a writer of breathtaking eloquence, reminding all, once again, that she is more than just Anne Rice's sister."

School Library Journal called it "a fresh and scintillating take on a well-loved theme."

The Dragon Queen has also been reviewed by the Romantic Times, Voice of Youth Advocates, Interzone, and Vector.

It was a 2001 Romantic Times Historical Romance of the Year nominee.
