= Alice Borchardt =

American writer (1939–2007)

- Born: Alice Allen O'Brien; October 6, 1939; New Orleans, Louisiana, US
- Died: July 24, 2007 (aged 67); Houston, Texas, US
- Occupation: Writer
- Spouse: Clifford Borchardt
- Relatives: Anne Rice (sister); Christopher Rice (nephew); Allen Daviau (cousin)
- Writing career
- Period: 1995–2003
- Genres: Historical fiction; fantasy; horror; romance

Alice Borchardt (née Alice Allen O'Brien; October 6, 1939 – July 24, 2007) was an American writer of historical fiction, fantasy, and horror. She shared a childhood of storytelling in New Orleans with her sister, the novelist Anne Rice, who was two years younger. A nurse by profession, as a writer she nurtured a profound interest in little-known periods of history.

== Biography ==
Alice Allen O'Brien was born in New Orleans on October 6, 1939. She was one of four sisters. Their father Howard, a postal worker, helped her apply for her first library card at age 7. "It was the best gift I ever received," Borchardt said in a 1999 interview with the Austin American-Statesman. Her mother, Katherine, was a feminist who taught Alice to pursue her career goals.

The O'Brien family moved to Richardson, Texas, when Alice was a teenager. She began her nursing career in Houston, where she met and married her husband, Cliff, and lived many years.

After a 30-year career as a licensed vocational nurse, Borchardt faced staff reductions at the hospital where she worked. Her sister Anne, a successful writer since their mid-thirties, encouraged Alice, helped her find an agent, and wrote introductions to several of her books.

Borchardt's death late on July 24, 2007, was reported next day by the mystery writer Bill Crider, a friend. The Houston Chronicle published an obituary five days later. In addition to her husband and sister, who lived in Rancho Mirage, Borchardt was survived by sisters Tamara Tinker of Daly City, Calif., Karen O'Brien and Micki Jenkins of Dallas; and by two nephews, Christopher T. Rice of Los Angeles and Daniel Tinker of Oakland.

== Literary career ==
Borchardt was in her mid-50s when the first of her seven novels, Devoted (1995), was published by Dutton Penguin. She may be best known for the Legends of the Wolves trilogy about werewolves in medieval Rome (The Silver Wolf, Night of the Wolf, and The Wolf King). The orphaned Regeane and the nobleman Maeniel, both shapeshifters -Maeniel being a wolf who is sometimes a man, and Regeane being a woman who is sometimes a wolf-, contend with bullying chieftains, embattled emperors and supernatural interventions. The last book in the series was published in 2001.

== Books ==
- Devoted (Dutton Penguin, 1995)
- Beguiled (Dutton, 1996)

In the tenth-century French town of Chantalon, Bishop Owen and his lady, Elin, marshal their forces in a desperate struggle against Viking raiders, but when Owen leaves to seek aid from his kinsmen and is captured by Bretons, Elin is left to defend Chantalon alone.

Legends of the Wolves trilogy

- The Silver Wolf (Del Rey Books, 1998)

An unwilling pawn in the plotting of the Rome of Charlemagne's time, Regeane is betrothed by her depraved uncle to an unknown barbarian lord. Unable to refuse lest he betray her as a shapeshifting wolf-woman, she is strangely attracted to a dark wolf prowling outside the city gates.

- Night of the Wolf (Del Rey, 1999) – prequel to The Silver Wolf

As the powerful forces of a conquering Rome sweep across ancient Druidic Gaul, an epic battle erupts between the shapeshifter Maeniel, a werewolf, and Dryas, the powerful Druid priestess summoned to destroy him.

- The Wolf King (Del Rey, 2001)

This book features Regeane and her sworn shapeshifter mate, wolf-turned-man Maeniel, in Dark Ages Italy. In a cliffhanger opening, a runaway Saxon slave saves Regeane from death in an Alpine avalanche. When the two attempt to take refuge in a nearby monastery, they discover a mad abbott under the control of an invading demon spirit, the Bear, who leads a ragtag troop of bandits and monks turned zombies. Although they escape with Maeniel's help, the Bear follows, determined to possess a werewolf body and increase its power. Maeniel undertakes a mission from Charles (Charlemagne) to scout the geographical and political landscape ahead of the king's troops as Charles lays siege to Lombardy and its self-indulgent ruler, Desederius. In the meantime, Regeane's greedy cousin Hugo bargains with the Bear spirit and finds himself caught up in Desederius's plot to capture Maeniel. Fortunately, Regeane and the Saxon arrive in time to rescue him.

Tales of Guinevere

- The Dragon Queen (Del Rey, 2001)

The daughter of a powerful pagan queen, Guinevere grows up under the protection of a Druid and the shapeshifting man-wolf, Maeniel, until the sorcerer Merlin forces her to fulfill her destiny as Arthur's queen.

- The Raven Warrior (Del Rey, 2003)

In Dark Age Britain, wild magic and superstitions hold sway. Even now that Guinevere has accepted the power of the Dragon Throne, she faces the threat of the Saxons and must strike first to protect her people. At the same time, Lancelot AKA Blackleg, Maeniel's wolf-born son, must prove himself as a man and a warrior.
