= Silver Wolf Award =

Silver Wolf Award may refer to:

- Silver Wolf Award (The Scout Association)
- Silver Wolf Award (Norwegian Guide and Scout Association)
- Silver Wolf Award (Scouterna)

== See also ==
- Silver Wolf
