= Eric Shaw Quinn =

American author

Eric Shaw Quinn is an American author, TV presenter, podcaster and producer. He has been listed on The New York Times Best Seller List. Alongside writer Christopher Rice, he is a partner in Dinner Partners, LLC., a production company which controls the estate of Rice's mother, Anne Rice.

== Biography ==
=== Early career ===
Quinn started his career working as an advertising executive between 1985 and 1986 at the Columbia, South Carolina firm of Chernoff/Silver and as a theater critic on local television station WIS.

Quinn's family had moved to the city when he was in sixth grade. After being transferred to his firm's Orlando office, he quit his job and moved to Los Angeles.

=== Publishing and podcasting ===
Quinn published is first novel, Say Uncle, about a gay man receiving custody of his sister's child after she dies in a car accident.

In 2004, Quinn was hired to write several books with celebrity Pamela Anderson. After their first meeting, Anderson sent Quinn a pair of lucite platform high heels with a note that said "Eric, if you're going to help me tell my story, you're going to have to walk a mile in my shoes." The first book they wrote together, Star, was on The New York Times Best Seller list.

In 2013, Quinn launched a streaming Internet radio show with close friend author Christopher Rice called The Dinner Party Show. Using Tracey Ullman as their inspiration, they streamed their blend of sketch comedy and celebrity interviews through their website and as a podcast. Their subsequent podcast, TDPS Presents Christopher & Eric focused more on true crime and was cited by law enforcement as being central to solving the thirty-year old cold case murder of gay adult video performer, William Arnold Newton.
