= Alien Secrets =

1993 novel by Annette Curtis Klause

- The cover of the 1994 Yearling edition ofAlien Secrets.
- Author: Annette Curtis Klause
- Publisher: Delacorte Books for Young Readers
- Publication date: January 1, 1993
- ISBN: 9780385309288

Alien Secrets is a children's science fiction novel by Annette Curtis Klause. It was first published in 1993. The book is in over 1400 libraries, according to WorldCat.

== Plot ==
The story revolves around a human female character named Puck. After being expelled from a boarding school on Earth, Puck is headed to an alien planet, which humans call Aurora, where her parents, who are xenoanthropologists hoping to study the native Shoowa, await her arrival. While aboard the spacecraft Cat's Cradle, she unexpectedly befriends an alien named Hush. Hush is desperately searching for a sacred artifact that has been stolen from him. The relic is of great importance; it is a valued item among his people. While aboard the spaceship, both Puck and Hush find themselves immersed in the mystery of lost objects and ghosts, and murder.

== Characters ==
- Puck (Robin Goodfellow) - A headstrong, opinionated 13-year-old human female.
- Hush - Alien

== Reception ==
Kirkus Reviews called the novel "great fun," highlighting Klause's writing skills and discussing how she juggles the plot "with admirable aplomb while devising a poetically literal manner of speech for Hush, deftly creating memorable characters [...], writing wonderfully suspenseful scenes [...], and slipping in some thoughtful, quite beautifully written passages."

Publishers Weekly provided a more mixed review, first praising Klause for her "extraordinary job of imagining Hush's culture and his pain at having lost the artifact," then discussing the faulty plot and pacing: "It takes Klause almost half the novel to establish all the plot points needed to generate real suspense, and after that leisurely set-up, the author moves too quickly, blurring details and trampling on what could have been exquisite moments."

Locus and Science Fiction Chronicle also reviewed the novel.

AudioFile reviewed the audiobook, narrated by Christina Moore, saying, "Moore's emphatic reading provides a current of excitement and urgency in this tale of interstellar crime and sabotage".

== Awards ==
Alien Secrets won the 1994 Maine Student Book Award and the 1995 Texas Bluebonnet Award.
