= Round the Red Lamp =

Collection of stories by Arthur Conan Doyle

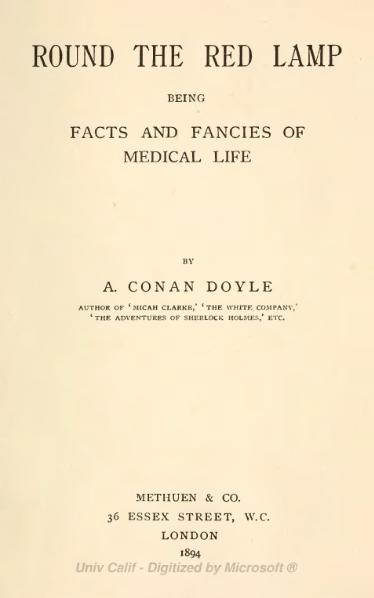
- Author: Sir Arthur Conan Doyle
- Language: English
- Published: London
- Publication date: 1894
- Publication place: United Kingdom

Round the Red Lamp: Being Facts and Fancies of Medical Life is a collection of medical and detective stories by Arthur Conan Doyle published on 23 October 1894. The genres of the stories range from sentimental realism to graphic horror. The series was suggested to the author by Jerome K. Jerome then editor of The Idler.

== Stories ==
- "His First Operation"
- "A Straggler of '15"
- "The Third Generation"
- ”A False Start”
- "The Curse of Eve"
- "Sweethearts"
- “A Physiologist’s Wife”
- "The Case of Lady Sannox”
- "A Question of Diplomacy”
- "A Medical Document”
- "Lot No. 249"
- "The Los Amigos Fiasco”
- "The Doctors of Hoyland 276”
- "The Surgeon Talks”
