= The Distants =

The Distants were an American indie rock band, based out of Los Angeles, California.

== Members ==
- Guinevere King: Vocals
- David Kelly: Guitar
- Jamie Douglass: Drums
- Steve Alderfer: Bass (2004-2007)
- Ben Jindra: Bass (2007–present)

By the beginning of 2008, undisclosed but implicitly tragic personal reasons had seen King suddenly depart from the band, leading the remaining three members to form a side project named Echo Hawk. Kelly's death shortly afterwards on March 30, 2008, effectively signalled the end of both bands.

== Discography ==
=== The Distants ===
The LP Broken Gold was released in 2006. It was produced by Kelly. King recalled that much of the content related to loss, as her brother had died two years previously.

1. The Further the Earth Gets from the Sun
2. Falling Apart
3. The Moth Song
4. She Sells Sanctuary
5. Girl on Girl
6. It's Over
7. Vertigo
8. Apparent Silence
9. February
10. The Following
11. Apparent Silence [Multimedia Track]

In 2007, the band performed a cover version of the Echo and The Bunnymen song The Killing Moon, which was included on the Blood & Chocolate soundtrack.

The band's second album, an EP named Be Your Shadow, was almost completed at the time of Kelly's death. Containing the tracks "Highways", "Luminol", "Be Your Shadow", "Chemical Burn", and "Let's Catch Fire", it was never released.

=== Echo Hawk ===
A single EP, Stiches, was released in February 2008.

1. Opposites Attack
2. SOS (Good Gurls Are Gone)
3. Hostess
4. Don't. Stop.
5. Stitches
