= The Silver Kiss =

1990 novel by Annette Curtis Klause

- First edition cover
- Author: Annette Curtis Klause
- Language: English
- Subject: Loss, Love, Vampires
- Genre: Young adult, Romance, Horror
- Publisher: Dell Publishing
- Publication date: September 1, 1990
- Media type: Mass market paperback/hardcover

The Silver Kiss is a young adult, romance and horror novel written by Annette Curtis Klause; it is printed in hardcover and paperback versions. The novel was Klause's first; it was published on September 1, 1990, and was re-issued in 2009 with two bonus short stories by Klause. The Silver Kiss was inspired by Klause's poems and her teenage fantasy about romancing with a vampire. It is set in a suburban area near the east coast, in the late 80s and explores themes of belonging, death, and loss through the romance between a young woman—Zoë Sutcliff—and Simon, an English vampire who was turned since he was a nineteen-year-old youth. During the story, Zoë's mother is in hospital dying from cancer. Zoë and Simon come to terms with their own mortality and the loss of their loved ones through their growing relationship and their battle with an evil vampire named Christopher.

The novel is a coming-of-age drama in which the characters must confront their fear of death and challenge their notions of it. Klause uses the horror genre to examine different types of horror such as terminal illness, spiritual horror in the form of vampires, and personal loss.

The Silver Kiss received numerous accolades; it was selected as Best Book of the Year Honor Book (1990) by Michigan Library Association, Best Books by School Library Journal (1990), and Best Books for Young Adults (1991) by American Library Association.

== Plot ==
Zoë Sutcliff is a young woman who experiences the slow death of her mother, Anne Sutcliff, and the dislocation of her father, Harry Sutcliff. She turns to her sole friend Lorraine, who cannot provide emotional support for Zoë. Lorraine moves to Oregon with her father and stepmother, leaving Zoë completely alone. On the news, there are reports of women being killed in Zoë's area, whose throats are slashed and drained of blood.

While walking in a park, Zoë meets Simon and begins a friendship with him; they eventually develop a mutual romantic attraction until one night she catches him eating a pigeon. He later tells her the truth of his origin, namely that he is a vampire from 17th-century England, and he is seeking to kill Christopher—his own brother—who looks like a six-year-old albino but is a sadistic version of what Simon could become. He reveals that Christopher is Zoë's neighborhood's throat-slashing killer, and his brother was also responsible for the murder of their mother and his vampirism; hence, he wants retribution against his brother. Prior to Simon's revelations, Lorraine was almost killed by Christopher when he attempted to lure her into an alley until Zoë reached her in time; Zoë now realizes that she has met the childlike vampire before and inadvertently saved her friend's life by interfering. Skeptical, Zoë allows Simon to feed upon her in a controlled manner to prove his claims.

Simon is entranced by the grief-stricken Zoë and must accept his feelings of fondness for her while trying to control his own nature. His growing attachment to Zoë puts them both at risk because of his feud with Christopher. Zoë tells Lorraine about her feelings for Simon, but does not tell her about him being a vampire. Zoë considers asking Simon to turn her mother into a vampire, but he tells her there is no cure for vampirism and that existence as one is unappealing.

Despite misgivings, Simon approaches Zoë; she lures Christopher into a trap where Simon has the strategic advantage. In a climactic battle, Simon slays Christopher. After the battle, Zoë offers herself to Simon for him to turn into a vampire for companionship. He refuses and, seeking the peace he has been unable to get since his transformation, decides to end his life now that his revenge is complete. Simon spends his final hours with Zoë and he dies peacefully after exposing himself to sunlight.

== Characters ==
- Zoë Sutcliff, the main character; a young woman in her late teenage years.
- Simon is a 340-year-old vampire from Bristol, England, and Zoë's love interest.
- Lorraine, Zoë’s best friend who moves to Oregon with her family.
- Anne Sutcliff, Zoë's mother, who is dying of cancer.
- Harry Sutcliff, Zoë's argumentative father.
- Christopher, Simon's older brother, who is also a vampire.

== Bonus stories ==
The 2009 reissue of The Silver Kiss contains two bonus short stories written by Klause; "The Summer of Love" and "The Christmas Cat".

== Reception ==
The Silver Kiss has been compared to the successful Twilight series as a vampire romance. The Silver Kiss was written several years before Twilight and has been successful by its own merits. Klause has been said to have successfully integrated "gory details" into a "sensuous and suspenseful story". The novel has been cited in the psychology journal Adolescence as an example of literature that can help adolescents understand death, "enabling them to understand the impact of trauma and identify corrective responses".

According to Publishers Weekly, Klause's use of themes and genres is "excessively ambitious", making "her suspense ... uneven, her love story inadequately rooted and her resolution just a bit pat". The reviewer, however, said Klause's use of the vampire figure and the quality of her prose points to "an intelligent and original eye".

Kathleen Reese of Entertainment Weekly gave the novel a "B+" on an A+ to F scale, and stated the novel is a "complicated story, but Klause tells it skillfully and simply".
