= The Silver Wolf =

1993 novel by Alice Borchardt

- First edition
- Author: Alice Borchardt
- Cover artist: Heather Kern
- Language: English
- Series: Silver Wolf (series)
- Genre: Fantasy novel
- Publisher: Del Rey Books
- Publication date: 1993
- Publication place: United States
- ISBN: 0-345-42360-7
- OCLC: 38200073
- Dewey Decimal: 813/.54 21
- LC Class: PS3552.O687 S55 1998
- Followed by: Night of the Wolf (novel) then by The Wolf King

The Silver Wolf is a novel by Alice Borchardt and published by Del Rey Books in 1993. It is the first in the Silver Wolf Trilogy.

== Plot summary ==
"I was born of darkness. My father's eyes closed before mine opened. I am not of this world or the other, and I have the right to be what I am ".

Regeane is a half-Saxon and half-Frankish woman whose father, Wolfstan, died because of her mother, Gisela. Wolfstan was a shapeshifter, a man who could change from human to a very large wolf, while her mother, Gisela, was frightened at the abnormality that her husband displayed. Due to Gundabald's urgings and pressure, Gisela grew to believe that Wolfstan was an offspring of the Devil Himself and eventually lured him to his death. When Gisela birthed Regeane, she was relieved to find no abnormalities.

When Regeane experiences her first sign of adulthood, she changes into this beautiful silver wolf. Gisela panics and forces poor Regeane to drink filthy concoctions, to pray for hours, to go to church, to promise never again to change as long as she lived. In return for that promise, Gundabald would take care of Regeane for a long time.

But when Gisela dies, the whole family falls into poverty and corruption, ending up with tattered clothing, temporary lodging in Rome and Regeane chained by the neck in the basement. Gundabald treats her worse and worse while Hugo, his son, is a more drunken wastrel than ever. Together, Gundabald and his son Hugo, a drunken wastreland the apprentice wastrel (Hugo) use up the money while Regeane is locked up in the house. But Regeane fights back and she finally escapes from the imprisonment when Gundabald's mood turns when he finds her a wealthy mountain lord by the name of Maeniel to marry her. Regeane escapes to Lucilla's villa, where Lucilla, Hadrian (the Pope), Antonius and many others befriend her and her smaller friend Elfgifa.

Antonius, who is a leper, is Regeane's friend and she ventures forth into the World of the Dead to find a cure for him before it is too late. On one of those many trips, she meets three wolves – one black, one gray and one red. Unknown to her, the gray wolf whom she desires is Maeniel, her future husband and lord.

On first sight, they both fall in love.

A few days later, Maeniel pays an unannounced visit to Lucilla's villa, where he drowns his future bride with more than a king's ransom of wealth.

After the wedding feast, a dispute begins when an assassin tries to kill Maeniel while he is occupied with Regeane. Regeane stops him by breaking his wrist bone with one hand over Maeniel's shoulder, grabbing him by the broken wrist. Due to the excessive bruising a normal woman could not have caused, he finds out that Regeane is, in fact, the silver wolf whom he desires.

What follows next is a desperate battle between Maeniel and Scapthar as the champions fight to see whether or not Regeane is to burn at the stake. Maeniel wins, and Scapthar is left for dead.

Finally, Gundabald is the last to be killed, and Regeane finally learns that Maeniel, her love, is the gray wolf.

== Reception ==
Judith Tarr of Tor.com praised Borchardt's writing and her "fully and deeply realized" worldbuilding and characterisation. Publishers Weekly wrote: "Readers who like their fantasy dusted with gritty realism and who can forgive anachronistic modern dialogue in a period melodrama will find themselves indulged with more than a few twists to this werewolf tale." Ian Emsley of Vector opined that the novel was "is in the vein of early Anne Rice, but lacks the patience that her sister had."
