= The Mummy's Foot =

- Short story by Théophile Gautier
- Original title: Le Pied de momie
- Translator: Lafcadio Hearn
- Country: France
- Language: French
- Genre: Gothic fiction

Publication
- Published in: Le Musée des familles
- Publication type: periodical
- Publication date: September 1840

The Mummy's Foot (French: Le Pied de momie) is a horror short story by the French writer Théophile Gautier, first published in 1840. It relates the fantastical tale of a contemporary man and the adventures which befall him when he ventures into a Parisian curiosity shop and buys the four-thousand-year-old foot of Princess Hermonthis.

== Plot summary ==
A man enters an antiques shop and buys a mummified foot which supposedly belonged to an Egyptian princess, Hermonthis. He intends to use the foot as a paperweight. In the night, he sees a vision of the princess, who explains her foot has been stolen, and he agrees to return her foot in exchange for a small statuette. The princess steals him away to Egypt where he meets her father and several other ancient pharaohs. Hermonthis' father, Xixouthros, is appropriately pleased that his daughter's foot is returned to the rest of her. Xixouthros asks what he can do in appreciation. The protagonist asks Hermonthis' hand in marriage, which is refused, as he is only 27 and Hermonthis is over 30 centuries, and deserves someone who is equally durable. The protagonist is abruptly woken from this potential dream by the arrival of a friend. Now awake, he observes that the mummified foot that was on his desk has indeed been replaced by the statuette.

== Adaptations ==
The story was adapted for television as part of the NBC Television anthology series Your Show Time, airing February 11, 1949.
