= Blood & Chocolate (film) =

2007 film by Katja von Garnier

- Theatrical release poster
- Directed by: Katja von Garnier
- Written by: Ehren Kruger; Christopher B. Landon
- Based on: Blood and Chocolate by Annette Curtis Klause
- Produced by: Wolfgang Esenwein; Hawk Koch; Gary Lucchesi; Tom Rosenberg; Richard S. Wright
- Starring: Agnes Bruckner; Hugh Dancy; Olivier Martinez; Katja Riemann; Bryan Dick
- Cinematography: Brendan Galvin
- Edited by: David Gamble; Emma E. Hickox
- Music by: Reinhold Heil; Johnny Klimek
- Production companies: Metro-Goldwyn-Mayer Pictures; Daniel Bobker Productions; Lakeshore Entertainment
- Distributed by: Entertainment Film Distributors (United Kingdom); MGM Distribution Co. (United States); Media Pro Pictures (Romania)
- Release dates: January 26, 2007 (US); February 9, 2007 (UK); November 11, 2007 (Germany)
- Running time: 98 minutes
- Countries: United States; Germany; Romania; United Kingdom
- Languages: English; German; Romanian
- Budget: $15 million
- Box office: $6.3 million

Blood & Chocolate is a 2007 fantasy-horror film directed by Katja von Garnier. It was written by Ehren Kruger and Christopher B. Landon and is loosely inspired by Annette Curtis Klause's 1997 young adult novel of the same name.

An international co-production between the United States, Germany, Romania and the United Kingdom, Blood & Chocolate was both a commercial and critical failure.

== Plot ==
Nineteen-year-old werewolf Vivian was born in Bucharest to Romanian parents who emigrated to America. Her parents and two siblings were murdered when she was nine.

Orphaned, she lives in Bucharest with her aunt Astrid who owns a chocolate store. Astrid is the former mate of the werewolf pack leader Gabriel who, in accordance with pack law, leaves her after seven years for a new mate. Once in a while he returns to sleep with Astrid, who remains painfully in love with him. Vivian is disgusted but Gabriel wants her as his mate, believing her to be the prophesied woman to bring about a "new age of hope" for the pack.

Vivian begins a romantic relationship with graphic novelist Aiden who is researching werewolves. Aiden has fled America where he is wanted for assaulting his father. Vivian does not reveal that she is a werewolf.

Their romance is monitored by Gabriel's son Rafe and his friends Ulf, Gregor, Finn, and Willem, together known as the "Five". Rafe is angry with Gabriel for leaving his mother, Astrid, and with Vivian due to Gabriel's intentions towards her. Seeing a drawing Aiden has done of Vivian calling her "Wolf Girl", he tells Rafe she may be a danger to the pack. Gabriel tells Rafe to make Aiden leave the city or he will die.

In an abandoned church Rafe fails to scare Aiden away and attacks him. He changes into a wolf and, attempting to bite Aiden, he bites into Aiden's silver pendant and quickly backs off. Aiden, realizing the werewolf myths are real, charges at Rafe holding the silver pendant and both fall from the balcony to the church floor. Regaining consciousness, Aiden sees Rafe dying in human form, with the silver pendant stuck in his neck. Grabbing his pendant, Aiden leaves the church.

Aiden confronts Vivian, daring her to hold the silver pendant. He tells her he killed Rafe and berates her for not confiding the truth and exposing him to danger. The Five discover Rafe's body in the church and take him to Gabriel, who breaks the news to Astrid while Vivian watches. Aiden is captured trying to leave the city.

In the forest Gabriel presents Aiden to the pack as their prey, telling Aiden he will be free if he makes it to the river at the edge of the forest. Vivian escapes her confinement and runs into the forest as a wolf to save Aiden. Aiden makes it to the river. Gabriel attempts to follow to kill him anyway but Vivian fights Gabriel, who falls into the river. Not recognizing Vivian in wolf form, Aiden stabs her with a silver knife. Vivian starts to bleed, slowly morphing back to human form. She needs an antidote to silver poisoning quickly or she will die.

Vivian takes Aiden to an abandoned film company building, telling Aiden the residual silver from the film guarantees no one will look for them there. She tells him of her guilt that her family was killed by hunters who followed her wolf tracks to their cabin. Aiden says she can control the wolf. Astrid arrives with a gun to kill Aiden; Vivian pleads with her, saying she should understand what it's like to lose a soulmate. Astrid relents and gives Vivian the gun. Vivian tells Astrid they will get the antidote from the pharmacist and then leave the city.

The pharmacist gives Vivian the antidote but also alerts Gabriel. Vivian tells Aiden to save himself and is captured by the pack. Aiden forces the pharmacist at gun point to give him all of his antidotes, silver dust, and silver bullets. He rescues Vivian, who kills Gabriel and helps the Five escape the now burning building, telling them "may you know the new age of hope when you see it".

They take Gabriel's car out of the city towards Paris, passing other werewolves who stop along the side of the road and bare their necks in respect, which identifies Vivian (and Aiden) as the new Alpha pair for the pack.

== Cast ==
- Agnes Bruckner as Vivian Gandillon. Jennifer Love Hewitt, Anne Hathaway & Jennifer Garner were considered for Vivian.
- Hugh Dancy as Aiden
- Olivier Martinez as Gabriel. Gael García Bernal was considered, but he turned it down.
- Katja Riemann as Astrid
- Bryan Dick as Rafe
- Chris Geere as Ulf
- Tom Harper as Gregor
- John Kerr as Finn
- Jack Wilson as Willem
- Vitalie Ursu as Constani
- Bogdan Voda as Albu
- Kata Dobó as Beatrice
- Maria Dinulescu as Girl in Red
- Mihai Gruia Sandu as Pharmacist

== Production ==
Since the novel's publication in 1997, many directors have attempted to pursue the adaptation. Po-Chih Leong became attached to direct in 2000. In January 2004, Ehren Kruger provided a new screenplay and signed on as executive producer, while music video director Sanji Senaka was set to make his directorial debut on the film. Rupert Wainwright would replace Senaka a few months later. Katja von Garnier would finally join the film in January 2005. Throughout these talks, Blood and Chocolate author, Annette Curtis Klause, was not kept up-to-date by the film's producers. Rather, she obtained information about film's progression from online sources.

The book was originally adapted into a script by Christopher Landon, whose father, Michael Landon, had a leading role in the film I Was a Teenage Werewolf (1957).

Principal photography was set in the historic section of Bucharest and at MediaPro Studios in Buftea. However, the film failed to accurately represent the city of Bucharest. For example, the film's Piata Romana (Romana Square) is actually the Curtea Veche yard (Old Court), and the film's Biserica Silvestru (Silvestru Church, located in downtown Bucharest) is actually a church in Stirbey Palace, Buftea, which is located tens of kilometers west of Bucharest.

=== Music ===
The film's score was composed by Reinhold Heil and Johnny Klimek. The soundtrack consists of 15 songs, none of which are featured in the film.

Songs featured in the film

1. "Garab" - Rachid Taha
2. "Let Yourself Go Wild" - Jasmin Tabatabai
3. "Velvet Hills" - Katja Riemann
4. "You Know the Truth" - Aurah
5. "Cash Machine" - Hard-Fi
6. "Amor Fati" - Aurah
7. "Silence Summons You" - The Sofa Club
8. "Eu Te Iubesc Prea Mult" - Nicolae Guta
9. "Stand My Ground" - Within Temptation

== Release ==
=== Box office ===
Blood & Chocolate opened on January 26, 2007 in 1,200 theaters. The film earned $2,074,300 during its opening weekend, ranking sixteenth at the domestic box office. By the end of its run, a little over two months later, the film had grossed $3,526,847 domestically and $2,784,270 overseas for a worldwide total of $6,311,117.

=== Critical reception ===
On the review aggregator website Rotten Tomatoes, 10% of 71 critics' reviews are positive, with an average rating of 3.6/10. The website's consensus reads: "Cheap CG effects and laughable dialogue make Blood and Chocolate worse than the usual werewolf flick." Metacritic, which uses a weighted average, assigned the film a score of 33 out of 100, based on 16 critics, indicating "generally unfavorable" reviews. Audiences polled by CinemaScore gave the film an average grade of "C" on an A+ to F scale.

The New York Times critic Jeannette Catsoulis gave a negative review, saying that the film was "uninvolving and cliché-ridden (even shape-shifters, it seems, deserve a falling-in-love montage), Blood & Chocolate is Romeo and Juliet with fewer manners and more exotic dentition. Cribbing shamelessly from Joel Schumacher's 1987 vampire classic, The Lost Boys, the director, Katja von Garnier, perches her pack on roofs and in rafters—an aerial lifestyle that works for bats but seems a bit of a stretch for wolves".
