= Roger Luckhurst =

British writer and academic

Distinguished Professor Roger Luckhurst
- Education: Hull University; University of Sussex
- Occupation(s): Professor in Modern and Contemporary Literature, Distinguished Visiting Professor
- Employer(s): Birkbeck, University of London; Columbia University
- Known for: Editorship of Oxford World's Classics series, trauma studies, science fiction
- Notable work: The Trauma Question; The Mummy’s Curse: The True Story of a Dark Fantasy; Zombies: A Cultural History

Roger Luckhurst is a British writer and academic and since 2020 the Geoffrey Tillotson Chair of Nineteenth Century Studies at Birkbeck College. He was appointed professor in modern and contemporary literature in the Department of English, Theatre, and Creative Writing at Birkbeck, University of London in 2008 and was distinguished visiting professor at Columbia University in 2016. He works on Victorian literature, contemporary literature, Gothic and weird fiction, trauma studies, and speculative/science fiction. Luckhurst is notable for his introductions and editorships to the Oxford World's Classics series volumes -- Late Victorian Gothic Tales, Dracula, Strange Case of Dr Jekyll and Mr Hyde, The Portrait of a Lady, H.P. Lovecraft's Classic Horror Tales, King Solomon’s Mines, and The Time Machine -- and for his books on J. G. Ballard (1997), The Invention of Telepathy (2002), Science Fiction (2005) The Trauma Question (2008), The Mummy’s Curse: The True Story of a Dark Fantasy (Oxford University Press, 2012), and Zombies: A Cultural History (Reaktion Press, 2015). He has also written two books for the British Film Institute classic film series on The Shining and Alien.

Luckhurst has written pieces for The Guardian and features for the film journal Sight and Sound and wrote and presented the BBC Radio 4 documentary about mummy curses in 2012. He has been an occasional film reviewer and commentator for the radio programmes Front Row and Free Thinking.

== Publications ==
- The Angle Between Two Walls: The Fiction of J. G. Ballard (1997)
- The Invention of Telepathy, 1870-1901 (2002)
- Science Fiction (2005)
- The Trauma Question (2008)
- The Mummy's Curse: The True History of a Dark Fantasy (2012)
- Zombies: A Cultural History (2015)
- Corridors (2019)
- Gothic: An Illustrated History (2021)
- Graveyards: A History of Living with the Dead (2025)
