= Jasmin Tabatabai =

German actress and singer

- یاسمین طباطبائی
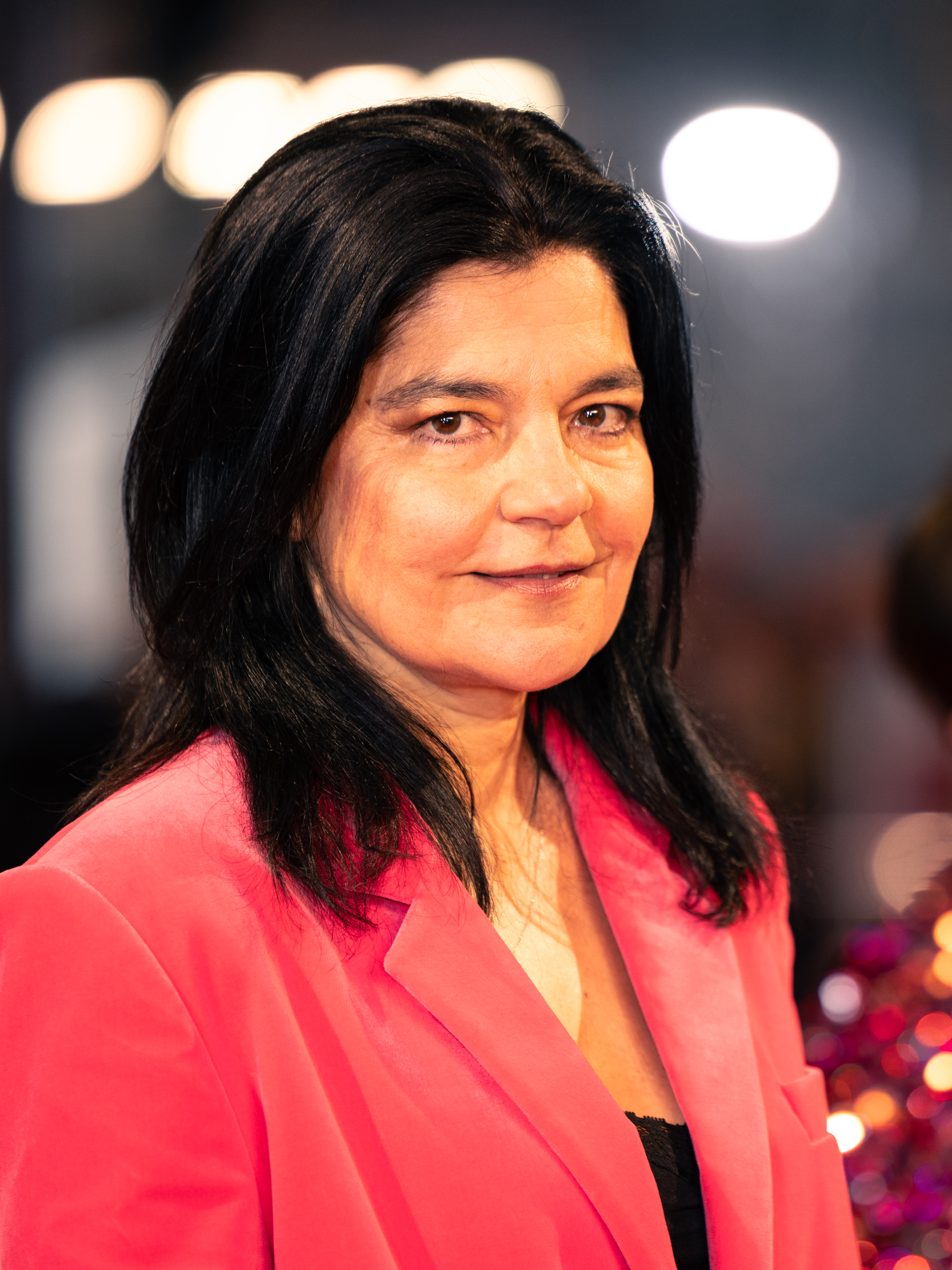
- Jasmin Tabatabai in 2026
- Born: 8 June 1967 (age 58); Tehran, Imperial State of Iran
- Occupation: Actor
- Years active: 1992–present
- Spouse: Tico Zamora (m. 2003; div. 2008)
- Partner: Andreas Pietschmann (2007–present)
- Children: 3

Jasmin Tabatabai (Persian: یاسمین طباطبائی, IPA: [jɒːsˈmiːn tæbɒːtæbɒːˈʔiː]; born 8 June 1967 in Tehran) is a German actress and singer.

== Biography ==
Jasmin Tabatabai's mother is German, and her father is Iranian. She was born and raised in Tehran until the 1979 Islamic Revolution, at which point she migrated with her mother to Germany. After completing school, she studied drama at the arts college in Stuttgart.

== Career ==
She had her first onscreen role in 1992 as the main character in the Swiss feature film Children of the Open Road, which earned her the award for best actress at the Amiens Film Festival in France. During her early work as an actress in Berlin, she co-founded the band Even Cowgirls Get the Blues as singer and songwriter.

The 1997 German film Bandits exposed Tabatabai to a larger audience. In addition to her acting role in the film, she also wrote and performed many of the songs for the soundtrack. The record for the film sold more than seven hundred thousand copies. She also voiced Megara in the German dub of Hercules.

Tabatabai's first album as a solo artist, Only Love, was released in 2002 along with the single After You Killed Me. Soon after she founded her own record label, polytrash. She also composed songs for the soundtrack of the 2004 movie Iron Jawed Angels together with then-husband Tico Zamora.

== Personal life ==
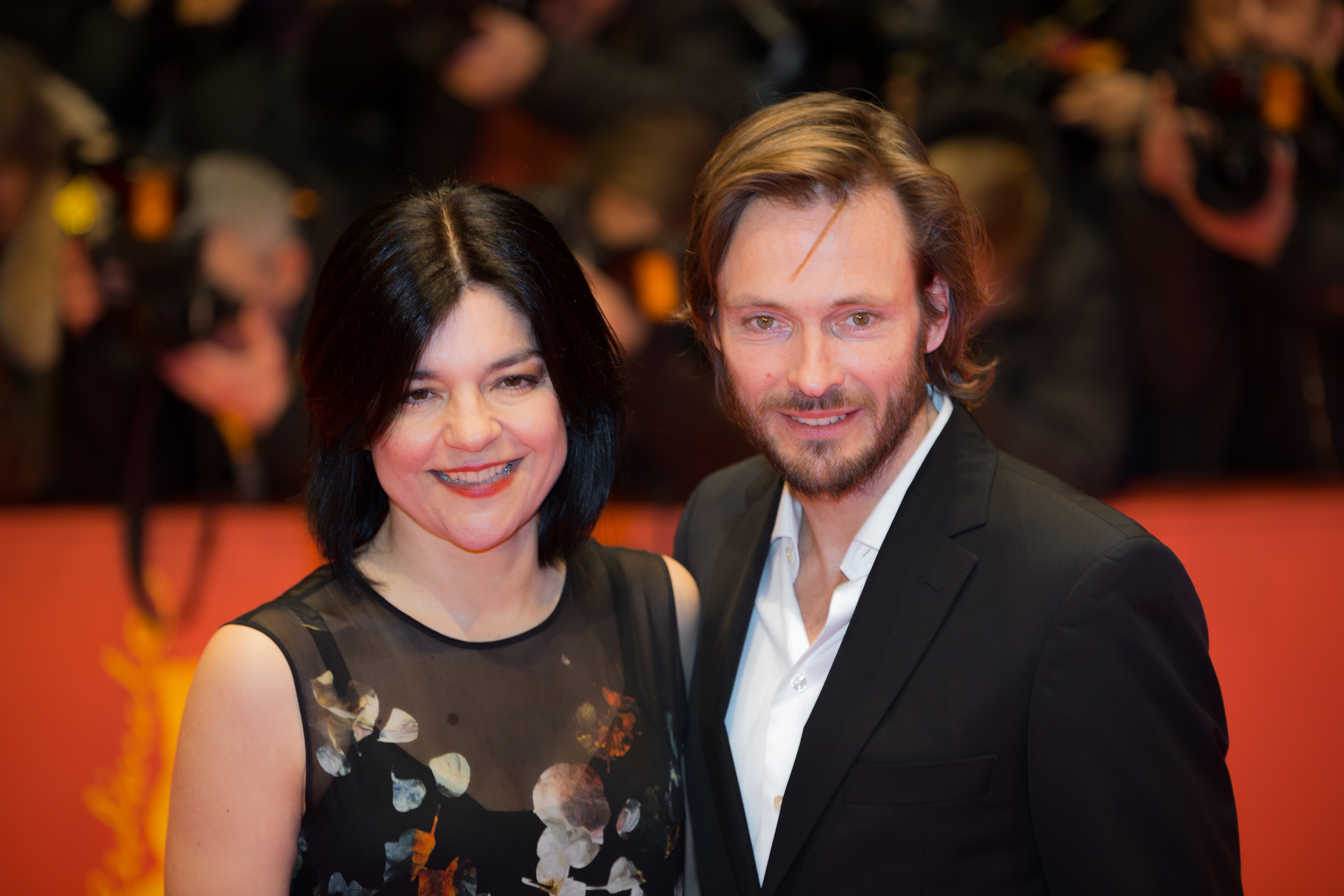
Jasmin Tabatabai with her partner Andreas Pietschmann at the Berlinale 2017

In December 2001, Tabatabai met American musician Tico Zamora. On 3 December 2002 she gave birth to their first and only child, a daughter named Angelina Sherri Rose. She and Zamora married on 1 June 2003 and separated by summer 2006. Their divorce was finalized in 2008.

She has been in a relationship with actor Andreas Pietschmann since the summer of 2007. They have two children: a daughter, Helena Leila (born 5 July 2009), and a son, Johan Anton (born 13 August 2013). Tabatabai and Pietschmann reside in Berlin.

== Awards ==
- 1997: Bavarian Film Award, Best Film Score

== Partial filmography ==
- Kinder der Landstrasse (1992)
- Dann eben mit Gewalt (1993, TV film)
- Lemgo (1994, TV film)
- The Meds (1995)
- The Cleaning Ladies Island (1996)
- Bandits (1997)
- Late Show (1999)
- Gierig (1999)
- Split Second (1999, TV film)
- Gripsholm (2000)
- No Place to Go (2000) as Meret
- Moonlight Tariff (2001)
- Fremde Haut (2005)
- Atomised (2006)
- Four Minutes (2006)
- Fay Grim (2006)
- Blood and Chocolate (2007)
- Messy Christmas (2007)
- Der Baader Meinhof Komplex (2008)
- Germany 09 (2009)
- Altiplano (2009)
- Mitra (2009)

== Music ==
- 1997: Bandits soundtrack
- 2002: Only Love
- 2004: Iron Jawed Angels soundtrack
- 2007: Blood and Chocolate soundtrack
- 2007: I ran

Jasmin Tabatabai & David Klein Orchester

- 2011: Eine Frau
- 2016: Was sagt man zu den Menschen, wenn man traurig ist?
