= Ramses the Damned: The Passion of Cleopatra =

2017 novel by Anne Rice and Christopher Rice

- Authors: Anne Rice; Christopher Rice
- Audio read by: Katherine Kellgren
- Language: English
- Genre: Horror
- Published: November 21, 2017
- Publisher: Anchor Books
- Publication place: United States
- Media type: Print (Paperback)
- Pages: 320
- ISBN: 978-1-101-97032-4 (first edition, paperback)
- Preceded by: The Mummy, or Ramses the Damned
- Followed by: Ramses the Damned: The Reign of Osiris

Ramses the Damned: The Passion of Cleopatra is a historical horror novel by American writers Anne Rice and her son Christopher Rice, published by Anchor Books on November 21, 2017. It a sequel to Anne Rice's 1989 novel The Mummy, or Ramses the Damned. A jointly-authored third novel in this series, Ramses the Damned: The Reign of Osiris, was released on February 1, 2022, two months after Anne Rice's death.

== Plot ==
The sequel and the original novel combine elements of the adventure, horror, supernatural thriller, historical romance, and erotica. Former lovers Ramses and Cleopatra have been resurrected by the same ancient elixir. While at odds over the use of their powers, they are both hunted by an immortal queen even older and more dangerous than themselves. The Passion of Cleopatra (like The Mummy) is set in 1914, in Africa and Britain. American novelist Sybil Parker, known for her novels of ancient Egypt, ventures on a tour of England. The material for Sybil's historical romances comes to her in vivid dreams about the lives of the Egyptian rulers. This inspiration is added to through research—including, in her mother's opinion, "too much Plutarch!" On arrival in the UK, Sybil visits the stately home of Alex, who is hosting an engagement party for Julie and Ramsey.

Also on the move, this time from Africa to England, Cleopatra has decided to frequent the event to rekindle her relationship with Alex and to confront Ramses and Julie. One of the realizations brought about by this collision of characters is that Cleopatra's soul has been repatriated in Sybil's body; the "dreams" that have inspired Sybil's novels are actually memories. Additionally, they are sometimes intense forebodings or current experiences of Cleopatra's. Cleopatra's memories, her "true spirit", are housed in the "vessel" or "tabernacle" of Sybil. As a result, Sybil discovers in herself at the novel's outset, having developed a "new authoritative voice" and assertiveness.

To a limited extent, Sybil and Cleopatra are able to converse virtually. Cleopatra, on first learning of the psychic connection, suspects Sybil of trying to usurp her identity and stealing her memories. Though her body is now totally healed, the restoration of her mind remains imperfect. She particularly grieves the loss of her memories of her son Caesarion, and recalls relentlessly the death of Antony and her desire to avenge it. To pacify and befriend Cleopatra, Sybil presents her with copies of all her Egyptian novels. The hope is that Cleopatra will be able to fill the gaps in her mind and find peace through reading about her past experiences and emotions as recorded by Sybil.

== Development ==
Anne Rice's 1989 novel The Mummy, or Ramses the Damned ended with the promise that "The Adventures of Ramses the Damned Shall Continue", but for decades this did not come to fruition. During a 2014 interview, Rice stated that she had delved back into the fictional universe established in The Mummy and that there was a strong possibility she could pen a sequel.

In February 2017, Anne Rice and her son Christopher Rice announced their collaboration on Ramses the Damned: The Passion of Cleopatra, a sequel to The Mummy. The novel is Anne's first writing collaboration with another author, and her first with her son. She later said, "Fans had been asking me for a sequel to The Mummy for years, and I got this idea that I thought it would be wonderful if Chris and I could collaborate." Explaining why they chose this project for their first collaboration, Christopher said, "The reason it's The Mummy is that everyone wanted a sequel to that book, and there wasn't one. I was present, for year after year at my mother's book signings, and saw people come up and ask, 'When is the next Mummy book?' And her attitude was, 'I don't have the time to do it on my own.'" Of their collaborative process, Anne said:

As it turns out, [Christopher] did most of the writing on the book and most of the heavy lifting in terms of the plotting. We had a meeting and made a road map of the plot, and he produced the first draft and the final draft. And then I went over it and added a number of things, particularly with the older characters from the first book. His focus was very much on the newer characters that he created for the sequel. Except for Cleopatra ... he wrote a lot about her. He really came to understand that character, and it worked out really well.

Christopher added:

I wrote a draft, I submitted it to her, and she did a really intensive read. Then we sat down together and pulled it apart, talked about what was working and what wasn't, and she sent me off with marching orders to write the next draft. And a lot of those marching orders were to emphasize the mysterious nature of immortals and not have them flinch or react in the same way an ordinary human character would.

The Passion of Cleopatra expands on the mythology of Rice's mummies in the same way she explored the backstory of her vampires in the 1985 novel The Vampire Lestat. She explained, “We do explore the origin of the Elixir of Life and where it came from, and the backstory of how Ramses got a hold of it. We love exploring the mythological background. Christopher was responsible for writing a lot of that.” Rice said that while her vampires are "a metaphor for the outsider and the outcast, and for people who walk in darkness", the difference in Ramses is his vulnerability. She added, "he can be captured, and somebody could force him to tell them the formula for the Elixir of Life and make other immortals. And also, he can't biologically have a child. He has to decide when to give this Elixir to someone, and it's not something that can be done lightly. To me, it's just a different way of writing about immortality."

Anne said, “We really enjoyed writing Ramses. We really hope we could do at least one more book in the series." Christopher agreed, “I would absolutely do it again, and we do have plans for another Ramses book, it's on the schedule.”

== Intertextuality ==
Sarah Olive of the University of York argues that Ramses the Damned: The Passion of Cleopatra and The Mummy are "passion" texts, in two senses of the word. Firstly, in describing Cleopatra's passionate sexuality in a way that is demonstrably indebted to William Shakespeare's characterization of her in his play. Secondly, in giving an account of her death and suffering, as in the Gospels' recollection of the Passion of Christ. She reads the Rices' novels' representation of Cleopatra against other characterizations of her in Henry Rider Haggard's She: A History of Adventure, Giuseppe Verdi's opera Aida (frequently featured in the novel), Joseph L. Mankiewicz's 1963 film Cleopatra starring Elizabeth Taylor, and the British comedy Carry On Cleo.

== Publication ==
The novel was published by Anchor Books on November 21, 2017.

== Reception ==
Publishers Weekly called The Passion of Cleopatra a "slick sequel" to The Mummy, noting that its "immortals gifted with virtual indestructibility scheme as nastily against one another as the similarly endowed characters in Anne Rice's celebrated Vampire Chronicles." The publication added, "In their first literary collaboration, the Rices, mother and son, configure these subplots into an entertaining soap opera replete with romantic alliances, betrayals, and ends left tantalizingly loose as grist for sequels."

== Sequel ==
A jointly-authored third novel in the series, Ramses the Damned: The Reign of Osiris, was released on February 1, 2022, two months after Anne Rice's death.
