= Freaks: Alive on the Inside =

Book by Annette Curtis Klause

- Author: Annette Curtis Klause
- Language: English
- Genre: Romance, Fantasy, Adventure novel
- Publication date: 2006
- Publication place: United States
- Media type: Print (hardback & paperback)

Freaks: Alive on the Inside (2006) is a young adult novel by Annette Curtis Klause.

== Plot summary ==
The story is of a young man, Abel Dandy, who is born in a freak show to his "freak" parents. Growing up normally in a world of oddities is hard for Abel, for he wishes for some type of oddness to enable him to fit it. A departing pair of Siamese twins gives Abel a ring from ancient Egypt that seems to have been made for him. Soon he begins to have dreams of a mysterious dancing girl calling for him.

Abel leaves the show at the dead of night to find his fortune only to be followed by Apollo, the dog-boy. A chain of events lead off to Abel finding what he most desired, and a lesson that preaches: freak or not, we are all human.
