= Blood and Chocolate (novel) =

1997 young adult paranormal romance novel by Annette Curtis Klause

- First edition cover
- Author: Annette Curtis Klause
- Cover artist: Cliff Nielsen
- Language: English
- Genre: Fantasy novel
- Publisher: Random House Inc.
- Publication date: 1997
- Publication place: United States
- Media type: Print (hardback & paperback)
- Pages: 264 pp
- ISBN: 0-440-22668-6
- OCLC: 42412510

Blood and Chocolate is a 1997 paranormal romance novel for young adult readers by Annette Curtis Klause. It is set in the contemporary United States.

== The Loups-garoux ==
In Klause's novel, the loup-garoux are a separate species from humans and wolves, but with elements of both in behavior and anatomy - referring to themselves as Homo lupus. There are two differing accounts of their origins alluded to in the book; some believe they are descended from a prehistoric breed of canine which absorbed protean matter from a meteorite which enabled them to shape-shift into humans, others that they were a tribe of ancient human hunters blessed by the moon goddess Selene. Most loup-garoux follow the latter account and thus worship Selene as their patron and mother.

Loups-garoux are portrayed as glorious beasts who revel in their dual nature, but do not reveal this truth to humans at the risk of violent backlash. In keeping with the traditional werewolf lore, silver is poisonous when introduced into the bloodstream, often proving fatal, and death is a real danger in that "anything that will sever the spine will do".

Loup-garou is the French word for "werewolf". Its plural form is loups-garous. A faux-French plural could be loups-garoux.

== Synopsis ==
Vivian is a sixteen-year-old loup-garoux who has just started high school in a new town, she explains the circumstances that brought her there; formerly, she and her pack lived in another town, the teenage pack members started to become more feral, using their wolf forms to scare humans, one day, a loup-garoux named Axel lost control, killed a human girl and was witnessed changing back from wolf to human form. While Axel was in prison, the other teenage loups-garoux killed another human to make it look like the "real" killer was still on the loose and Axel was released. Vivian's father, the pack leader, killed Axel for endangering the pack, but Vivian pleaded with him to spare the lives of the other teenagers. Not long after, suspicious neighbors set fire to the pack's house. Vivian's father and a few others were killed, and the pack had to relocate.

In the new town,, Vivian has no friends because of her reserved and secretive nature; many girls she attends school with find her intimidating and are jealous of her beauty. However, she is intrigued by a boy named Aiden who has written a poem about werewolves that is surprisingly accurate with regards to their transformation. She at first suspects Aiden might be a werewolf himself, but soon figures out that he is a pure-blooded human. She is still attracted to him and pursues a relationship with him, despite her mother, Esmé's disapproval. Esmé doesn't want Vivian to date a human and fears that Vivian might reveal the secret of the pack.

Meanwhile, the pack is restless in their new location, and the pack's five teenage males - Rafe, Finn, Willem, Ulf and Gregory - are getting out of control. Rafe's father, Lucien, has a drinking problem. To Vivian's embarrassment, her mother and Ulf's mother, Astrid are constantly fighting over a 24-year-old man named Gabriel, even though both women are in their 40s with teenage children. Vivian dislikes Gabriel because he seems the most likely candidate to take over her father's position as alpha male; furthermore, Gabriel is attracted to Vivian and doesn't listen to her rejections. He often visits Esmé's house, but really it is with the intention of seeing Vivian. This seems to drive Vivian closer to Aiden.

When Astrid, Lucien and a few other pack members run around near the suburbs in their wolf skins, it becomes evident that the pack badly needs a leader. Since there is no agreement over who it should be, they decide to elect the leader via Ordeal; a free-for-all brawl where any male who is of age can participate, anyone who has blood drawn is disqualified, and the last two can fight to the death or if one surrenders to the other. Afterwards, the pack females will participate in the Bitch's Dance, a fight to determine who will be the new leader's mate.

Gabriel wins the Ordeal and Astrid instantly attacks Esmé, seemingly with the intent to kill. Without realizing what she's doing, Vivian leaps in to save her mother's life. She seriously wounds Astrid, taking out one of her eyes. After defeating Astrid, Vivian is declared the alpha female and Gabriel's mate; horrified, Vivian runs back to her home, terrified of being both the alpha female and Gabriel's mate. The next day, Gabriel declares that he'll wait as long as Vivian needs, but eventually she'll come around to him. The rest of the pack agrees with Gabriel's assessment.

However, Vivian is stubborn and continues to reject Gabriel while pursuing Aiden with even more effort. Vivian and Aiden are close to the point where they might have sex and she decides she wants him to know the truth about her before they get intimate. She reveals her beast form to Aiden; he crouches in a corner in fear and starts to throw things at her to chase her away. Hurt and afraid of losing her self-control, she jumps out of his window and into the night.

Vivian wakes up in her own bed the next morning, with human blood on her nails and no memory of what happened after revealing herself to Aiden. Later on, she sees a TV news story about a man who has been killed by a "wild animal." Vivian starts experimenting with alcohol and in the following days she tries to get Aiden alone to explain what she is and ease his fears, but he avoids her and uses his human friends as buffers. In an attempt to get Aiden back, she attends a concert that they had planned to attend together, but his friends confront her with the lies that Aiden told them were the reason he broke up with her. Shocked and hurt that he would say such awful things about her, Vivian breaks down, whereupon Gabriel suddenly appears and takes Vivian home. Gabriel tries to comfort her, hinting that he once revealed himself to a human and like her, came to regret it.

Another murder occurs. Again, Vivian wakes up with no memory of the incident, but finds a human hand on the floor of her bedroom. Convinced that she is the murderer, Vivian decides to commit suicide for the sake of the pack. She douses herself in kerosene, but before she can light the match, she is apprehended by Gabriel, Willem and Ulf. Ulf admits that his mother, Astrid and her new lover, Rafe were setting Vivian up for the murders: Astrid still holds a grudge against Vivian for winning Gabriel and ripping out her eye in the process and Rafe was mad at her for dating a human instead of him. They committed the murders and planted the blood on Vivian, knowing she was experiencing a great deal of stress from keeping her wolf nature controlled around Aiden.

Aiden sends Vivian a note asking her to meet him "for the sake of what we used to have." Vivian realizes that Astrid and Rafe must have found the note, which was carried by Aiden's friend and the killers' latest victim. Vivian goes to meet Aiden and tries to get him out of danger, while Gabriel, Willem and Ulf go to gather the pack so they can be there when judgment is passed on Astrid. When Vivian gets to the meeting place, Aiden points a gun at her, explaining he has a silver bullet made from his pentagram necklace. Vivian tries to explain that she isn't the killer, but since Aiden doesn't know there are other werewolves, he refuses to believe her. Just as he's about to shoot her, Astrid and Rafe show up in their hybrid forms. Astrid says that they're going to kill both Aiden and Vivian, and pretend they "did what they had to do." She also explains that it's mainly because of her grudge over Gabriel that she wanted to do this to Vivian. Rafe didn't realize that she meant to kill Vivian and he's hurt when she mentions she wanted Gabriel and the two of them start arguing. In the middle of it, Vivian tells Aiden to shoot Rafe while she leaps for Astrid.

Aiden's shot works and Rafe falls dead. Just as Vivian and Astrid's fight starts to get serious, Gabriel steps in and two other pack members apprehend Astrid. Gabriel explains that they have no prisons and no jailers; there is only one sentence for endangering the pack. He snaps Astrid's neck, killing her. Aiden is terrified from seeing so many werewolves and shoots at Gabriel, but Vivian leaps in front of him to take the bullet. Gabriel forbids Aiden from ever coming into contact with Vivian or any other pack member and says that they will watch him for the rest of his life to ensure he never tells anyone about the pack; Aiden runs away in terror. The pack's healer manages to get the bullet out of Vivian, but she ends up stuck in her hybrid form, neither human nor wolf and unable to fully change into either one.

Two weeks later, Gabriel enters Vivian's bedroom, where she is grieving being trapped between forms as well as her heartache, he finally tells her his story - that he had once loved a human woman and like Vivian, had been convinced that she would accept and love him regardless of what he was. He admits that when he had been making love to the human woman he had to suppress the urge to shift and says that dating humans isn't merely inadvisable - it is impossible and dangerous. Gabriel accidentally shifted in front of his human girlfriend and when both panicked, he accidentally killed her. Gabriel's raw sadness and honesty makes Vivian realize that she had been in love with the idea of Aiden's acceptance of her, not because he was the mate that she needed.

Vivian and Gabriel share a kiss and, Vivian is finally able to transform again. Gabriel takes Vivian outside for the first time in days and they run off into the woods together in their wolf forms - a black and silver wolf respectively. Vivian accepts her place in the pack as alpha female and Gabriel's mate and, reflects on the joy she has in being a werewolf and having someone who now finally and completely understands her.

== Reception ==
=== Awards ===
Blood and Chocolate won the 1998 YALSA Award for Best Books for Young Adults. In 2000, it won the South Carolina Book Award for Young Adult Book Award.

=== Controversy ===
According to the American Library Association, Blood and Chocolate was the 57th most banned and challenged book in the United States between 2000 and 2009. It was also the tenth most banned and challenged book in 2001 due to being sexually explicit and unsuited to the age group.

== Film adaptation ==
The novel was adapted into a film in 2007 and released January 26. By the end of its run, a little over two months later, the film had grossed $3,526,847 domestically and $2,784,270 overseas for a worldwide total of $6,311,117. On Rotten Tomatoes, the film has an 11% rating based on 63 reviews. On Metacritic, the film has a 33 out of 100 rating from 16 critics, indicating "generally unfavorable reviews".

Very little of Klause's original storyline, characters and plot points are maintained in the adaptation. This has often led to criticism from the fans of the novel that the film's director and production team took too many artistic liberties with the source material.

=== Variation From Novel ===
The film adaptation is significantly different from the book in many aspects. All characters are portrayed as older than the novel versions, Vivian and Aiden are scaled up to be 19 years old and Gabriel is portrayed to be in his late 30s. In the film Vivian's background story is drastically changed including the death of her family, in the film Esmé does not appear. Rafe is also made to be Gabriel's and Astrid's son rather than the temporary love interest of Astrid.

Both Gabriel and the pack as a whole are portrayed drastically different. Gabriel is depicted as a cruel, harsh and aggressive alpha of the pack who has set his sights on Vivian as his next "mate" according to a tradition in the pack for the leader to take a new mate every few years. Reasons behind this change were not explained. In the film Gabriel is the main antagonist who delights in directing his pack to ritualistically hunt down and kill humans every full moon - he orders Aiden to be hunted by the pack for having a relationship with Vivian.

Additionally in the movie the relationship between Aiden and Vivian has a drastically different outcome. Instead Aiden discovers the existence of werewolves from Rafe, not Vivian and he does not reject her for what she is. After rescuing Aiden from being hunted by the pack they take off to hide, heal Vivian from the silver poison and escape the city as well as the pack and start a life together elsewhere. In the end of the film Aiden and Vivian end up together after killing Gabriel together and flee the city - the future of the pair and whether Vivian takes place as alpha is hinted at but uncertain.
