= Christopher Rice =

American fiction writer

- Born: Christopher Travis Rice; March 11, 1978 (age 48); Berkeley, California, U.S.
- Education: Brown University; New York University
- Occupation: Author
- Parents: Stan Rice (father); Anne Rice (mother)
- Relatives: Alice Borchardt (aunt)
- Writing career
- Genres: Suspense, crime, supernatural thriller, erotic romance, historical
- Website: christopherricebooks.com

Christopher Travis Rice (born March 11, 1978) is an American author. Rice made his fiction debut in 2000 with the bestselling A Density of Souls, going on to write many more novels, including The Snow Garden, The Heavens Rise, The Vines, as well as the Burning Girl series. His work spans multiple genres, including suspense, crime, supernatural thriller, and erotic romance. With his mother Anne Rice, he is the co-author of the historical horror novel Ramses the Damned: The Passion of Cleopatra and its sequel, Ramses the Damned: The Reign of Osiris. As of 2025, Rice lived in West Hollywood, California.

== Early life and education ==
Christopher Rice was born on March 11, 1978. His parents were novelist Anne Rice and poet Stan Rice; his aunt, Alice Borchardt, was a noted writer of fantasy and historical fiction. Rice had an older sister, Michele, who died from leukemia in 1972 when she was five years old.

Rice was born in the San Francisco Bay Area and spent the first ten years of his childhood in the Castro District. Rice described the culture shock that resulted from his family's move to New Orleans when he was ten years old: "I went from a school in San Francisco where we called our lesbian teachers by their first names to this uptown, private elementary school where we all had to go to chapel in the morning."

Rice is a 1996 graduate of the Isidore Newman School, which he attended during the same time period as future NFL stars Peyton Manning and Eli Manning. He has stated that while he was never physically threatened during high school, his knowledge of his own sexuality and his failure to play athletics made him feel like an outcast. Of this time in his life, Rice said, "I had money, had a nice car, was white. I could have fit in, but I knew I didn't belong. I knew I didn't share their dreams and ambitions and their values". These experiences inspired his first novel, A Density of Souls.

Rice began visiting gay bars and clubs during his senior year of high school, but he did not come out to his parents until he met his first boyfriend. His father accepted Rice's sexuality, but his mother initially believed he was bisexual based on his past relationships.

Rice went on to attend Brown University, an experience which inspired his second novel, The Snow Garden. During his freshman year, he intended to become an actor. He transferred to Tisch School of the Arts where he studied Dramatic Writing. He did not graduate from either school; he instead moved to Los Angeles to explore writing screenplays.

== Career ==
Some of Rice's works contain descriptions of contemporary American life for the gay male. When asked in 2002 about "being pegged a 'gay writer'", he replied:

That's not what I do. I might be more open to that label if I hadn't introduced ensemble casts of characters. Granted, A Density of Souls is as close to a gay book as you can get. It revolves around a character's homosexuality and others are described in terms of their reaction to the one character's sexuality. In that sense, it's at the core of the book. The Snow Garden is about identity. With this book, I'm trying to shrug off the term "gay" author.

Rice is proud of the reaction of the gay community to his writing, explaining "it was incredibly rewarding when I got a huge positive response from the character Stephen in A Density of Souls. More than a thousand young gay men contacted me and said that I captured what it was like for them going through those years. That means everything to me."

=== Early novels ===
In December 1998, Anne Rice had a medical crisis and nearly died when she fell into a diabetic coma. Her son Christopher wrote his first novel, A Density of Souls, upon returning home to New Orleans during her recuperation. Published the following year, Souls generated buzz in the gay and mainstream press, and became a New York Times Best Seller. His second novel, The Snow Garden received a Lambda Literary Award for Best Gay Men's Mystery. For many years, Rice wrote a regular column for the LGBT-related biweekly news magazine The Advocate called "Coastal Disturbances," in which he discussed various topics.

=== Supernatural horror ===
Early in his career, Rice distinguished himself by saying that unlike his famous mother, he did not write horror novels, instead considering his books to be thrillers. However, as years went by, Rice became more comfortable experimenting in different genres, exploring his own version of the supernatural with works such as The Heavens Rise, published in 2013, and The Vines. Both of these novels were met with critical acclaim, and each was nominated for the Bram Stoker Award for Superior Achievement in a Novel, but they lost to Dr. Sleep by Stephen King and Blood Kin by Steve Rasnic Tem, in their respective years. On the publication of The Heavens Rise in 2013, Rice told The Advocate magazine that part of his motivation for writing the novel came from a desire to tell a New Orleans-set story with a more sympathetic ensemble of characters than the one featured in his debut, A Density of Souls. "I said my first novel put the city through such hell, both figuratively and literally, at least certain neighborhoods. But honestly, what happened to me is that I grew up. And I saw my perspective on the city and some of its communities in A Density of Souls to be youthful and unforgiving. And I had a desire to back and write a kinder, gentler New Orleans story, which, because I'm a Rice, turned into a horror novel."

=== The TDPS Network ===
In 2012, Rice launched a streaming Internet radio show called The Dinner Party Show with Eric Shaw Quinn, his producing partner and co-host, who was known for having ghost written two books by celebrity Pamela Anderson and a 1992 novel about gay adoption called Say Uncle. The show describes itself as "the Internet's first live comedy variety show" and became known for its hard-hitting satire and celebrity interviews Guests have included Patricia Cornwell, Dan Savage, transgender activist Chaz Bono and Tales of the City author Armistead Maupin. In 2019, after placing the show on hiatus to begin development of The Vampire Chronicles television series, Rice and Quinn returned with a new podcast entitled TDPS Presents CHRISTOPHER & ERIC, which included a regular series focused on true crime television documentaries they called Christopher & Eric's True Crime TV Club.

=== Erotic romance ===
In 2014, Rice announced through his social media channels that he was scheduled to publish several works of erotic romance. The first of them, The Flame, was published in November 2014 as part of the 1,001 Dark Nights series.

In 2021, Rice announced a new "acknowledged" pen name devoted to tales of romance between men, C. Travis Rice. Between 2021 and 2023, he published the first three novels in his Sapphire Cove series, Sapphire Sunset, Sapphire Spring and Sapphire Storm. "After years of being pressured to convert my gay men into either a heroine's brother or best friend," he wrote, "Sapphire Cove became a place to tell the stories I'd always wanted to tell about the men I've loved." A fourth novel in the series, Sapphire Dawn, was published in 2024.

=== Collaborations with Anne Rice ===
On November 26, 2016, Anne Rice announced that the film and television rights to her entire Vampire Chronicles franchise had reverted to her after unsuccessful attempts to launch them as a film franchise with Universal Pictures and Imagine Entertainment. Her announcement included the detail that she and Christopher would be executive producers on a planned TV series based on the franchise.

On February 28, 2017, the Rices announced their first novel written in collaboration, Ramses the Damned: The Passion of Cleopatra. It was published on November 21, 2017. Of the collaboration with his mother, Christopher said, "I had to be taught how to write...scenes from an immortal's point of view in a way that fits with an Anne Rice book because immortals don't engage or interact with everyday ordinary stimuli the way we would. They have an absence of fear and an absence or reactivity, and that's something Mom really counseled me on." Anne would publicly state that Christopher was largely responsible for inventing the origin story for The Elixir of Life, first introduced in the first novel in the series and responsible for giving Ramses and Cleopatra their immortality. Anne would also reveal that Bektaten, an ancient African queen responsible for inventing the elixir, was almost entirely Christopher's invention. Publishers Weekly called Ramses The Damned: The Passion of Cleopatra a "slick sequel" to The Mummy, noting that its "immortals gifted with virtual indestructibility scheme as nastily against one another as the similarly endowed characters in Anne Rice's celebrated Vampire Chronicles." The publication added, "In their first literary collaboration, the Rices, mother and son, configure these subplots into an entertaining soap opera replete with romantic alliances, betrayals, and ends left tantalizingly loose as grist for sequels."

In early 2020, Anne revealed she had sold the studio rights to both The Vampire Chronicles book series as well as her Lives of the Mayfair Witches series to AMC Studios, the home of such shows as The Walking Dead and Killing Eve, with her and Christopher as executive producers on all films and television series produced under the deal. In a May 13, 2020 announcement of the deal Christopher Rice said, "AMC Studios is responsible for creating some of the most iconic television series of the modern era and has, at times, single-handedly defined this era we call 'peak TV'. All the members of Team Anne, including my long-term producing partner, New York Times Bestselling novelist Eric Shaw Quinn, are both thrilled and comforted to know that some of our most cherished kin, from the vampire Lestat and the witch Rowan Mayfair, to the paranormal investigators at the Order of the Talamasca and the powerful spirit Lasher, are now safely in the hands of these vastly accomplished innovators who possess both global reach and deep reservoirs of experience."

== Bibliography ==
=== Early novels ===
- A Density of Souls (2000)
- The Snow Garden (2001)
- Light Before Day (2005)
- Blind Fall (2008)
- The Moonlit Earth (2010)
- The Heavens Rise (2013)
- The Vines (2014)

=== Erotic romance (1,001 Dark Nights / The Desire Exchange series) ===
- The Flame (2014)
- The Surrender Gate (2015)
- Kiss the Flame (2015)
- Dance of Desire (2016)
- Desire & Ice (2016)

=== Collaborations with Anne Rice ===
- Ramses the Damned: The Passion of Cleopatra (2017)
- Ramses the Damned: The Reign of Osiris (2022)

=== The Burning Girl series ===
- Bone Music: A Burning Girl Thriller (2018)
- Blood Echo: A Burning Girl Thriller (2019)
- Blood Victory: A Burning Girl Thriller (2020)

=== Recent works ===
- Decimate (2022)
- Sapphire Sunset, as C. Travis Rice (2022)
- Sapphire Spring, as C. Travis Rice (2022)
- Sapphire Storm, as C. Travis Rice (2023)
- Sapphire Dawn, as C. Travis Rice (2024)
- Party of Three: A Sapphire Cove Suite Secrets Novella, as C. Travis Rice (2025)
