= Annette Curtis Klause =

American novelist

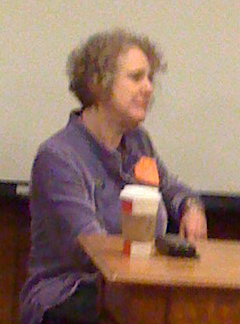
- Born: June 20, 1953 (age 73); Bristol, England
- Education: University of Maryland, College Park (BA, MLS)
- Occupations: Writer, librarian
- Writing career
- Period: 1990–present
- Genre: Young adult fiction

Annette Curtis Klause (born June 20, 1953) is an American writer and librarian, specializing in young adult fiction. She is currently a children's materials selector for Montgomery County Public Libraries in Montgomery County, Maryland. Born in Bristol, England, she now lives in Hyattsville, Maryland with her husband Mark and their cats. She holds a Bachelor of Arts degree in English literature and a Master of Library Science degree from the University of Maryland, College Park.

== Bibliography ==
=== Novels ===
- The Silver Kiss (1990, Delacorte)
- Alien Secrets (1993, Delacorte)
- Blood and Chocolate (1997, Delacorte)
- Freaks: Alive on the Inside (2006, Margaret K. McElderry)

=== Other publications ===
Klause contributed book reviews to the School Library Journal from 1982 through 1994.
