= Anne Rice bibliography =

Bibliography of an American author

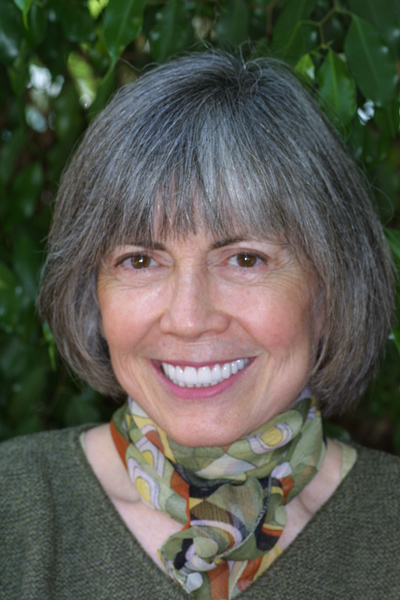
- Novels↙: 37
- Nonfiction↙: 1

The following is a complete list of books published by Anne Rice, an American author of Gothic fiction, Christian literature, and erotica. She has sold nearly 100 million copies. Rice has published 37 novels, including four under the pen name A.N. Roquelaure, two under the pen name Anne Rampling, two with her son, Christopher Rice, and one non-fiction book.

== Novels ==
Year	Title	Publisher	ISBN	Series	Notes
1976	Interview with the Vampire	Knopf	ISBN 0-394-49821-6	The Vampire Chronicles #1	
1979	The Feast of All Saints	Simon & Schuster	ISBN 978-0671247553	-	
1982	Cry to Heaven	Knopf	ISBN 978-0-385-12167-5	-	
1983	The Claiming of Sleeping Beauty	E. P. Dutton	ISBN 0-452-26656-4	The Sleeping Beauty Quartet #1	Published under the pseudonym A. N. Roquelaure
1984	Beauty's Punishment	E. P. Dutton	ISBN 0-525-48458-2	The Sleeping Beauty Quartet #2	Published under the pseudonym A. N. Roquelaure
1985	The Vampire Lestat	Knopf	ISBN 1-127-49040-0	The Vampire Chronicles #2	
1985	Beauty's Release	E. P. Dutton	ISBN 0-452-26663-7	The Sleeping Beauty Quartet #3	Published under the pseudonym A. N. Roquelaure
1985	Exit to Eden	Arbor House	ISBN 0-87795-609-X	-	Published under the pseudonym Anne Rampling
1986	Belinda	William Morrow and Company	ISBN 0-87795-826-2	-	Published under the pseudonym Anne Rampling
1988	The Queen of the Damned	Knopf	ISBN 978-0394558233	The Vampire Chronicles #3	
1989	The Mummy, or Ramses the Damned	Ballantine Books	ISBN 0-345-36000-1	Ramses the Damned #1	
1990	The Witching Hour	Knopf	ISBN 0-394-58786-3	Lives of the Mayfair Witches #1	
1992	The Tale of the Body Thief	Knopf	ISBN 978-0-679-40528-3	The Vampire Chronicles #4	
1993	Lasher	Knopf	ISBN 0-679-41295-6	Lives of the Mayfair Witches #2	
1994	Taltos	Knopf	ISBN 0-679-42573-X	Lives of the Mayfair Witches #3	
1995	Memnoch the Devil	Knopf	ISBN 0-679-44101-8	The Vampire Chronicles #5	
1996	Servant of the Bones	Knopf	ISBN 978-0676970036	-	
1997	Violin	Knopf	ISBN 0-679-43302-3	-	
1998	Pandora	Knopf	ISBN 0-375-40159-8	New Tales of the Vampires #1	
1998	The Vampire Armand	Knopf	ISBN 978-0-679-45447-2	The Vampire Chronicles #6	
1999	Vittorio the Vampire	Knopf	ISBN 0-375-40160-1	New Tales of the Vampires #2	
2000	Merrick	Knopf	ISBN 0-679-45448-9	The Vampire Chronicles #7	Crossover with the Lives of the Mayfair Witches series
2001	Blood and Gold	Knopf	ISBN 0-679-45449-7	The Vampire Chronicles #8	
2002	Blackwood Farm	Knopf	ISBN 0-345-44368-3	The Vampire Chronicles #9	Crossover with the Lives of the Mayfair Witches series
2003	Blood Canticle	Knopf	ISBN 0-375-41200-X	The Vampire Chronicles #10	Crossover with the Lives of the Mayfair Witches series
2005	Christ the Lord: Out of Egypt	Knopf	ISBN 0-375-41201-8	Christ the Lord #1	
2008	Christ the Lord: The Road to Cana	Knopf	ISBN 067697807X	Christ the Lord #2	
2009	Angel Time	Knopf	ISBN 978-1-4000-4353-8	Songs of the Seraphim #1	
2010	Of Love and Evil	Knopf	ISBN 0-676-97809-6	Songs of the Seraphim #2	
2012	The Wolf Gift	Random House	ISBN 978-0-307-59511-9	The Wolf Gift Chronicles #1	
2013	The Wolves of Midwinter	Random House	ISBN 978-0-385-34996-3	The Wolf Gift Chronicles #2	
2014	Prince Lestat	Knopf	ISBN 978-0-307-96252-2	The Vampire Chronicles #11	
2015	Beauty's Kingdom	E. P. Dutton	ISBN 978-0-525-42799-5	The Sleeping Beauty Quartet #4	Published under the pseudonym A. N. Roquelaure
2016	Prince Lestat and the Realms of Atlantis	Knopf	ISBN 978-038535379-3	The Vampire Chronicles #12	
2017	Ramses the Damned: The Passion of Cleopatra	Anchor Books	ISBN 978-1-101-97032-4	Ramses the Damned #2	Written with Christopher Rice
2018	Blood Communion: A Tale of Prince Lestat	Knopf	ISBN 978-1524732646	The Vampire Chronicles #13	
2022	Ramses the Damned: The Reign of Osiris	Knopf	ISBN 978-1524732646	Ramses the Damned #3	Written with Christopher Rice

== Nonfiction ==
Year	Title	Publisher	ISBN
2008	Called Out of Darkness: A Spiritual Confession	Anchor Books	ISBN 0307388484
