= The Sleeping Beauty Quartet =

Quartet of erotic novels by Anne Rice

- Penguin trade paperback cover
- Author: Anne Rice
- Language: English
- Genre: Erotic novel
- Publisher: E. P. Dutton/Plume, New York, NY, U.S.A.
- Publication date: The Claiming of Sleeping Beauty: 1 March 1983; Beauty's Punishment: 26 March 1984; Beauty's Release: 3 June 1985; Beauty's Kingdom: 21 April 2015
- Publication place: United States
- Media type: Print, audiobook
- Pages: The Claiming of Sleeping Beauty: 253
- ISBN: 0-452-26656-4 (The Claiming of Sleeping Beauty, 1983 hardcover and trade paper editions); ISBN 0-525-48458-2 (Beauty's Punishment); ISBN 0-452-26663-7 (Beauty's Release); ISBN 978-0-525-42799-5 (Beauty's Kingdom)
- OCLC: 22915205

The Sleeping Beauty Quartet is a series of four novels written by American author Anne Rice under the pseudonym of A. N. Roquelaure. The quartet comprises The Claiming of Sleeping Beauty, Beauty's Punishment, Beauty's Release, and Beauty's Kingdom, first published individually in 1983, 1984, 1985, and 2015, respectively, in the United States. They are erotic BDSM novels set in a medieval fantasy world, loosely based on the fairy tale of Sleeping Beauty. The novels describe explicit sexual adventures of the female protagonist Beauty and the male characters Alexi, Tristan, and Laurent, featuring both maledom and femdom scenarios amid vivid imageries of bisexuality, homosexuality, ephebophilia, and pony play.

In 1994, the abridged audio versions of the first three books were published in cassette form. The Claiming of Sleeping Beauty was read by actress Amy Brenneman. Beauty's Punishment was read by Elizabeth Montgomery (known for her role in the ABC situation comedy Bewitched) as Beauty with Michael Diamond as Tristan, and Beauty's Release was read by Montgomery with actor Christian Keiber reading as Laurent. A compact disc version of the audiobooks was read by Genviere Bevier and Winthrop Eliot.

== Background ==
After the success of Interview with the Vampire (1976), Anne Rice wrote two extensively researched historical novels, The Feast of All Saints (1979) and Cry to Heaven (1982). Neither of them gave her the critical acclaim or the commercial success of her first novel; the main complaints about The Feast of All Saints were that it was too heavy and dense to read easily, and most of the reviews for Cry to Heaven were so savagely negative that Rice felt devastated. She had been thinking about a story set during the time of Oscar Wilde for the next novel, but decided to abandon it and go back to the erotic writing she had explored in the 1960s. Her idea was "to create a book where you didn't have to mark the hot pages" and "to take away everything extraneous, as much as could be done in a narrative". To gain a creative freedom for the new work, Rice adopted the pen name A. N. Roquelaure from the French word roquelaure, referring to a cloak worn by men in the 18th-century Europe. Rice only finally came out as the author of the trilogy during the later 1990s.

The trilogy was written in the 1980s when many feminists denounced pornography as violation of women's rights, but Rice firmly believed that women should have the freedom to read and write whatever they pleased, and considered the trilogy her political statement.

A fourth book in the series, Beauty's Kingdom, was published in April 2015.

== Plot ==
=== The Claiming of Sleeping Beauty ===
In the first chapter of the story, Beauty is awakened from her hundred-year sleep by the Prince, not with a kiss, but through copulation, initiating her into a Satyricon-like world of sexual adventures. After stripping her naked he takes her to his kingdom, ruled by his mother Queen Eleanor, where Beauty is trained as a slave and a plaything. The rest of the naked slaves, dozens of them, in the Queen's castle are princes and princesses sent by their royal parents from the surrounding kingdoms as tributes. In this castle they spend several years learning to become obedient and submissive sexual property, accepting being spanked and forced to have sex with nobles and slaves of both sexes, being publicly displayed and humiliated, and crawling around on their hands and knees like animals until they return to their own lands "being enhanced in wisdom."

In the castle Beauty meets another slave, Prince Alexi, with whom she copulates passionately. After that he tells her about the long rigorous journey he had in the castle. Alexi previously had been a stubborn prince who fought back all the attempts to break him, until the Queen sent him to the kitchen to have him tortured by crude kitchen servants. Alexi received such a savage and merciless punishment there that he began to lose his senses and, after some particularly humiliating training at the hands of a strong stable boy, Alexi became a totally surrendered slave, playing various sexual games at the Queen's commands.

The moral of Alexi's story notwithstanding, Beauty willfully disobeys, and the book closes with her being sentenced to brutal slavery in the neighboring village while her master weeps.

=== Beauty's Punishment ===
The second book starts as Beauty and another naked slave from the castle, Prince Tristan, are sold at auction in the village square. Beauty is purchased by the inn keeper Mistress Lockley while Tristan is bought by Nicholas, the Queen's chronicler. At Lockley's inn Beauty meets the Captain of the Guard, who forces her to pleasure him and then takes her to a drunken orgy with his soldiers. Tristan is bound and harnessed as a pony with a tail plugged in his rear, and made to pull Nicholas' cart while being whipped. When the cart arrives at an orchard, he is ordered to collect apples with his mouth, and trained to "satisfy" other human ponies in the stable. Afterward, Nicholas has Tristan paddled at the Public Turntable, which devastates the prince, and forcibly copulates with him in the bed.

The next day, after having made Tristan march through the crowded streets, which included a short but intense meeting with the Captain of the Guard, Nicholas asks Tristan a series of questions as to what makes a strong, highborn prince obey with such a complete submission. Tristan answers, after some hesitation, that he loves anyone who punishes him no matter how crude or lowly they are and desires the loss of his self amid all the punishments, eventually "becoming" the punishments himself. Nicholas is moved by the answer and, after a frantic intercourse, confesses to him that he is in love with Tristan.

Beauty witnesses the harsh punishment of a runaway slave, Prince Laurent, as he is bound to a wooden cross and the Captain whips him all over his muscular body, and later sees Tristan pulling a cart carrying Laurent in a penitential procession. Tristan begs Nicholas to be allowed to meet Beauty and they reunite in Nicholas' house. Beauty and Tristan copulate as Nicholas watches behind a one-way mirror. Suddenly, Arab soldiers raid the village and several naked slaves, including Beauty, Tristan, and Laurent, are kidnapped. The book closes as they are sent across the sea to serve in the palace of the Sultan.

=== Beauty's Release ===
The third book begins with the captured slaves' journey on the ship to the Sultan's realm. While being imprisoned in a cage, Laurent contemplates the recent punishments he received as a runaway on a wooden cross, recalling its pain, degradation and undeniable pleasure. After their arrival at the exotic land of the Sultan, the captured slaves are groomed by a group of young boys and examined by Lexius, the Sultan's steward. Beauty is taken to the harem and is mounted on the phallus of a bronze statue. She is then greeted by Inanna, one of the Sultan's wives, with whom she copulates and is shocked to discover that Inanna's clitoris has been surgically removed.

Laurent and Tristan are taken to an all-male sadomasochistic orgy, being mounted on a cross and whipped. However, in private, Laurent overpowers Lexius and rapes him. Afterward Laurent and Tristan are taken to the Sultan, made to perform a mutual fellatio on each other in his presence, and then the Sultan anally copulates with Laurent. Laurent and Tristan retire from the Sultan's bedroom and when they are beginning to train Lexius as their secret slave, a rescue team led by the Captain of the Guard arrives and Laurent takes Lexius with him to their ship along with Beauty and Tristan. During the last leg of the voyage, the Captain tells Beauty that she is to be released from her servitude because of her parents' demands and, to her great dismay, sent back home to get married: she hysterically protests, but to no avail.

Back at the castle, the Queen takes Lexius as her slave and sends him to the merciless kitchen servants who trained Prince Alexi earlier in the first book. She then sentences both Laurent and Tristan to the village stable for Laurent's rebelliousness and Tristan's failure to become a good slave. They are made to live and work as ponies, pulling all sorts of carts and drawing plows in the fields during the daytime, and having homosexual orgies with other human ponies at night. Tristan, as a pony, reunites with his former owner Nicholas on a temporary basis. However, Laurent's father unexpectedly dies and he is summoned back to his own kingdom against his wish, to become the new ruler. The book ends as Laurent marries Beauty, saying that they shall live happily ever after, or perhaps "a good deal happier" than anyone else could ever guess— thus hinting that they will continue the pleasure of dominance and submission with each other.

=== Beauty's Kingdom ===
Twenty years after the events of Beauty's Release, Beauty and Laurent take over the throne following the death of Queen Eleanor and strive to continue the sensual surrender legacy of the kingdom, albeit now in a state of voluntary servitude.

== Themes ==
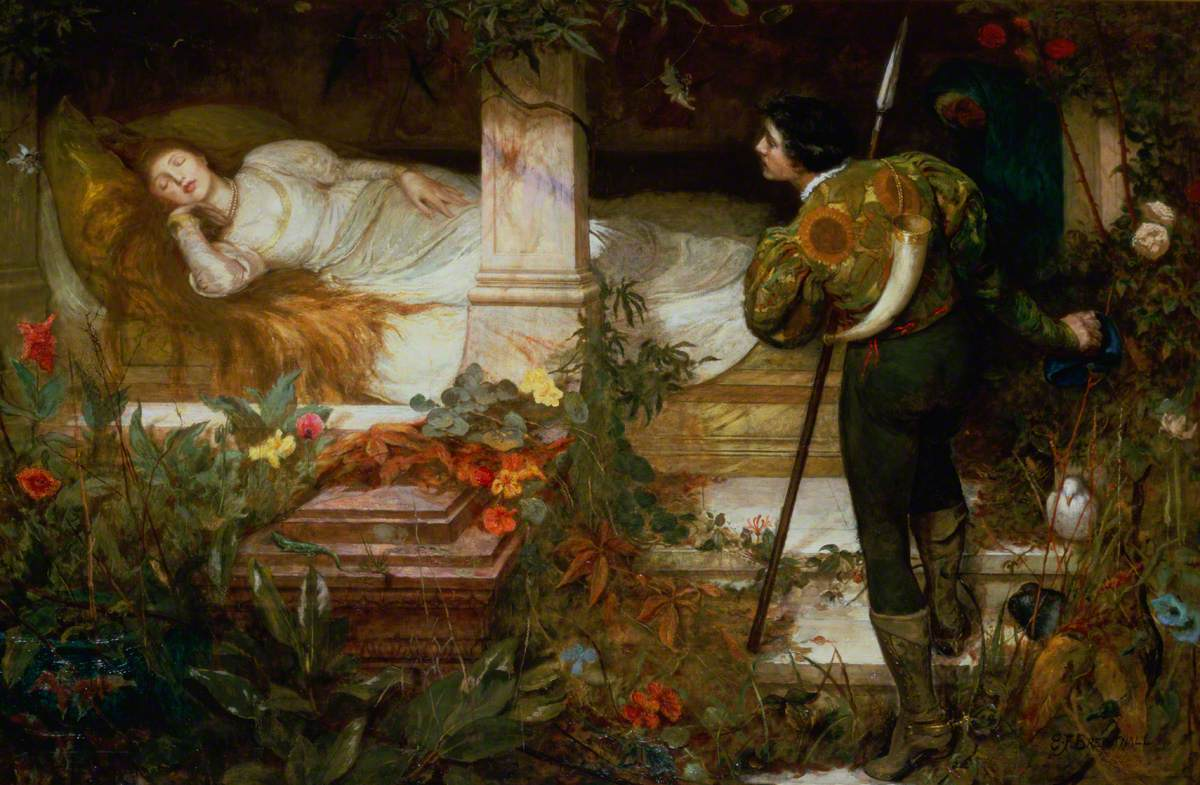
Sleeping Beauty by Edward Frederick Brewtnall

The fairy tale of Sleeping Beauty has been analyzed by folklorists and other scholars of various types, and many of them have noticed prominent erotic elements of the story. Some versions of the tale have Beauty raped and pregnant while sleeping, and only waking up after childbirth. The child psychologist Bruno Bettelheim commented that the tale "abounds with Freudian symbolism" and that the princes who try to reach Sleeping Beauty before the appropriate time only to perish in the thorns surrounding her castle serves as a warning that premature sexual encounters are destructive. Feminist theorists have focused on Sleeping Beauty's extreme passivity and the sexual nature of her awakening in the fairy tale. Anne Rice literalized these symbolic sexual elements—particularly, the passive sexual awakening or rape of Beauty that has been denounced by feminists—in the story by rewriting it into an explicit sadomasochistic erotica. However, Rice's cross-gender identification with the submissive male characters with receptive capacity in the trilogy—Alexi, Tristan and Laurent—enabled her to circumvent the equation of the female gender and masochism and, via their homoerotic interactions with the dominant male characters, she could exploit the erotic potential of phallic power while at the same time going beyond its boundary and "turning it against itself".

Another foremost difference in Rice's rewriting is that the story takes Beauty to a series of far harsher trials after her period of extreme passivity in a coma-like sleep. In the beginning of the first book, the Prince takes Beauty with her parents' consent, having persuaded them that, after completing the sexual servitude in his castle, the slaves emerge with "wisdom, patience, and self-discipline", as well as a full acceptance of their innermost desires and an understanding of the suffering of humankind. Her royal parents, although saddened by the absence of their daughter, are promised that she will return "greatly enhanced in wisdom and beauty". However, this unconventional education in sexual hardship and liberation ends in a monogamous, patriarchal marriage between Beauty and Laurent. In the 1994 issue of Feminist Review, Professor Amalia Ziv of Ben-Gurion University described the trilogy as "definitely more of a comedy" when compared to darker BDSM novels such as Story of O, and commented that "like all comedies, it ends in marriage".

== Reception ==
The trilogy was a commercial success and gained a significant cult following. Rice was able to secure the publishing contract for her next erotic novel Exit to Eden (1985) with an advance of $35,000 (equivalent to $108,000 in 2025) from Arbor House. There were allegations that Rice was a dominatrix in real life since the trilogy deals with the BDSM practice so exclusively, but her husband, Stan Rice, replied that "she's no more sadomasochistic than she's a vampire". When the director of the Columbus Metropolitan Library declared the trilogy "hardcore pornography" and removed all print and audiocassette copies from the library shelves in 1996, Rice objected, arguing that the trilogy was "elegantly sensual" and harmless to readers. The trilogy is included in the American Library Association's list of "100 most frequently challenged books" of the 1990s, with the term "challenge" defined in American literature as "an attempt to remove or restrict materials, based upon the objections of a person or group".

Professor Linda Badley of Middle Tennessee State University wrote in her 1996 book Writing Horror and the Body on the trilogy, that rewriting the myth of Sleeping Beauty as sadomasochistic fantasies enabled Anne Rice to explore "liminal areas of experience that could not be articulated in conventional literature, extant pornography, or politically correct discourse".

== Television adaptation ==
It was announced in September 2014 that Televisa U.S.A had obtained the rights to adapt the trilogy into a television series. Rice was to serve as executive producer alongside Rachel Winter, producer of the film Dallas Buyers Club. As of 2026, the series was never developed.

== See also ==
- List of BDSM fiction
- List of most commonly challenged books in the United States
