= The Wolf Gift =

2012 novel by Anne Rice

- Author: Anne Rice
- Language: English
- Subject: Werewolves
- Genre: Gothic, horror, werewolf
- Published: February 14, 2012
- Publisher: Random House
- Publication place: United States
- Media type: Print, e-Book
- Pages: 416
- ISBN: 978-0-307-59511-9
- Followed by: The Wolves of Midwinter

The Wolf Gift is the thirty-first novel by Gothic writer Anne Rice, published in February 2012 by Random House. The novel tells the tale of Reuben Golding, a well to do journalist at the fictional San Francisco Observer who is attacked by and turned into a werewolf. He spends the duration of the story fleeing the authorities, the media, and DNA analysts.

On April 5, 2012, Rice promoted the novel on The Colbert Report. The book debuted at number 6 on The New York Times Best Seller list for print and E-book fiction. and number 3 on the Hardcover Fiction list.

== Background ==
The novel is set in Northern California, an area where Rice lived a large portion of her life. Several scenes of the novel take place in a redwood forest. Rice explained that The Wolf Gift was not her return to supernatural fiction, stating that the religiously themed novels, Christ the Lord: Out of Egypt and Christ the Lord: The Road to Cana revolved around mystical events as well.

At San Diego Comic-Con, Rice spoke with MTV about The Wolf Gift: "It's about a young man who becomes a werewolf. It's my take on what that experience is like for that young man, to experience that transformation and how it works in his life and how he copes with it."

== Reception ==
Entertainment Weekly gave the book a letter grade of B minus, marking the most memorable scenes as those where the protagonist practiced and discovered his werewolf powers. This exploration was compared to that of Spider-Man.

Gregory Cowles, writing for The New York Times said, "[Anne Rice] once again mixes vaguely philosophical inquiries about good and evil with standard horror trappings. He furthered his review with an excerpt: "His fingers, or were they claws, touched his teeth and they were fangs! He could feel them descending, feel his mouth lengthening!...His voice was guttural, roughened....His hands were thickly covered with hair!" Cowles then compared the lycanthropic transformation to puberty. Cowles supported his comparison with a quote from Rice's Amazon.com review of the film The Company of Wolves:

"...a 1984 movie by Neil Jordan (who also directed the big-screen version of "Interview"). Werewolf films have for decades dealt with the emerging sexuality of adolescents. But this film outdoes them all...It’s in a class with films like Cocteau's Beauty and the Beast. It goes deep to the very core of what the werewolf myth has always been about."

== Characters ==
- Reuben Golding – protagonist
- Father Jim Golding – brother
- Phil Golding – father
- Grace Golding – mother
- Marchent Nideck – brief lover
- Felix Nideck – sub-leader of the werewolves and Marchent's ancestor
- Margon – leader of the werewolves
- Laura Dennys – girlfriend

== Minor characters ==
- Celeste – ex-girlfriend
- Mort – best friend
- Stuart – newly changed werewolf
