= Pablo Montes =

Pablo Montes is the name of:

- Pablo Montes (athlete) (1945–2008), Cuban sprinter
- Pablo Montes (footballer) (born 1985), Honduran footballer
- Pablo Montes, fictional character in the novel Servant of the Bones
