= The Witching Hour (novel) =

1990 novel by Anne Rice

- First edition cover of The Witching Hour (1990)
- Author: Anne Rice
- Language: English
- Series: Lives of the Mayfair Witches
- Genre: Gothic; supernatural; horror; fantasy
- Publisher: Knopf
- Publication date: October 19, 1990
- Pages: 976
- ISBN: 0-394-58786-3
- Followed by: Lasher

The Witching Hour is a 1990 Gothic horror novel by Anne Rice published by Knopf. It is the first novel in the Lives of the Mayfair Witches trilogy by Anne Rice and was followed by Lasher (1993) and Taltos (1994).

The novel follows Dr. Rowan Mayfair, a talented neurosurgeon in San Francisco, California who discovers she is the heir to a dynasty of powerful New Orleans witches linked to an ancient spirit named Lasher.

The Witching Hour debuted at No. 2 on The New York Times Best Seller list.

== Plot ==
Dr. Rowan Mayfair is a gifted neurosurgeon in San Francisco, California. When her estranged birth mother Deirdre Mayfair dies in New Orleans, she begins to learn about the old Southern family to which she belongs. Michael Curry is a contractor who specializes in the restoration of old homes while dreaming of his childhood in New Orleans and yearning to return there. Rowan gradually realizes that she has the psychic power to either save or take lives. Michael drowns but she revives him, the near-death experience triggering a new and unwanted clairvoyant ability within him. Michael and Rowan fall in love, and when he decides to return to New Orleans, she follows him to learn the secrets of her past.

Aaron Lightner, a psychic scholar and member of the Talamasca, has studied the Mayfairs from afar for decades. The matriarchal family—known to the Talamasca as the "Mayfair Witches"—have a long and sordid history. Among the supernatural events surrounding them is a mysterious man, seen by Michael in his childhood and by other members of the family over time. Michael is revealed to be a Mayfair cousin, he and Rowan sharing lines of descent from the male witch Julien Mayfair. Rowan and Michael marry and conceive a child. As the designee of the Mayfair legacy, Rowan assumes control of the family's affairs. Soon the mysterious man reveals himself to her: he is Lasher, a spirit with wicked motives who has plagued the Mayfairs for centuries. His wish is to be made flesh so that he may walk the earth again in the permanent physical form of a human being, and he sets about slowly seducing Rowan.

Secretly thinking that she can outwit Lasher, Rowan sends Michael away from the house on Christmas Eve. Her plan is to bind Lasher to "weak matter" which she can destroy with her mental killing power, but this backfires. Lasher enters her womb and makes himself at home in the fetus. Rowan immediately goes into labor, which is violent and bloody, and Lasher enters the world as a human infant. But the hybrid baby immediately grows into a full-sized, intelligent man. Michael returns and tries to kill the creature, but Lasher is too strong and nearly drowns Michael in the pool. During this second near-death experience, Michael ends up losing the unwanted psychic sensitivity in his hands. Fearing for Michael's life, Rowan flees to Europe with Lasher.

== Background ==
The Mayfairs' First Street house is based on Rice's own antebellum mansion in New Orleans, with fictional events written as if taking place in specific locations in the real-world house. Rice bought the mansion with the advance for The Witching Hour. She called The Witching Hour "a Gothic epic", and said, "The Turn of the Screw is a wonderful haunting novel [but it is] just the beginning. I want The Witching Hour to be as great or greater than Henry James."

== Reception ==
The Witching Hour debuted at No. 2 on The New York Times Best Seller list, and remained in that position for four weeks, spending a total of 22 weeks on the list.

Susan Ferraro of The New York Times described The Witching Hour as "a ghost story about an evil spirit called Lasher who is so permeated with foreboding and evil that themes like abortion and incest are merely secondary. There is Christian symbolism straight and skewed, rough sex and necrophilia." Ferraro called the novel "unquestionably absorbing" but noted, "At the end, it seems to stumble ... because the fiercely protective Michael does something completely out of character to make way for the denouement; ultimately what creaks loudest is not the haunted house but the plot."

Writing for The New York Times, Patrick McGrath found Lasher's origins "intriguing", and described the many characters in the extended Mayfair family as "all vividly sketched, all gloriously weird." He noted the novel's "tireless narrative energy" and "relentless inventiveness", but also called it "bloated" with repetitive storytelling. McGrath also criticized the characterization of central human characters Rowan and Michael, writing that "they have both been so constructed that they hardly for a moment live or breathe except as structural elements serving specific design functions in the grand scheme." According to Publishers Weekly, "This massive tome repeatedly slows, then speeds when Rice casts off the Talamasca's pretentious, scholarly tones and goes for the jugular with morbid delights, sexually charged passages and wicked, wild tragedy."
