= Belinda (Rice novel) =

1986 novel by Anne Rice

- 1986 edition
- Author: Anne Rice
- Language: English
- Genre: Erotica
- Published: October 1986
- Publisher: William Morrow and Company
- Publication place: US
- Pages: 476
- ISBN: 0-87795-826-2

Belinda is a 1986 novel by Anne Rice, originally published under the pen name Anne Rampling.

Belinda follows in the footsteps of Exit to Eden in its themes of the darker side of human romance. Whereas the earlier novel explored BDSM, Belinda explores the relationship between a grown man and an underage girl.

== Overview ==
The novel explores the relationship between a 44-year-old divorced children's book author and artist, Jeremy Walker, and a 16-year-old runaway who attaches herself to him. Unaware of who Belinda really is, Jeremy falls in love with her and paints her portraits nude. When he discovers Belinda's true identity, things unravel quickly as his career and freedom are threatened, as well as the love he feels for Belinda. The novel narrates the sexual union and love between Jeremy and Belinda.

The novel deals with an illegal relationship: the age of consent in California, where most of the novel's events take place, is 18. When Belinda meets Jeremy Walker, she is 16 years old. Her name is Belinda Blanchard, her mother is international movie and television star Bonnie. Belinda is estranged from her mother and on the run from her controlling but generally clueless Uncle Daryl, who is convinced that Belinda is out to ruin Bonnie's career. Jeremy Walker doesn't know any of this until he is in love with Belinda, and they have been together for several months. The novel describes numerous relationships with large age gaps, including one between Belinda's world-famous hairdresser father, G.G. and an actor named Ollie Boon. Although Belinda is the only character who is a minor, and is much younger than any of the other characters, the novel raises the question whether genuine love can exist between two people with a large age difference, and whether or not it is morally right.

== Publication ==
Belinda was published originally in hardcover in October 1986 by Arbor House, as well as published in softcover by Fitzhenry & Whiteside Ltd., at the same time. Jove Books published it again in May 1988 in soft cover.

== Reception ==
Publishers Weekly wrote: "The concluding chapters are badly marred by a heavy dose of saccharine, but its rivetingly seductive, gothic overtones lend a fine, eerie flavor to scenes stretching from brash Hollywood deals to the darkness of an enshrined house in New Orleans." Kirkus Reviews concluded: "Lusty, provocative, and--despite its kiddie-porn core--more entertaining than shocking, Belinda is Lolita with a refreshing 80's twist."
