= Exit to Eden (film) =

1994 film by Garry Marshall

Exit To Eden
- Theatrical release poster
- Directed by: Garry Marshall
- Written by: Deborah Amelon; Bob Brunner
- Based on: Exit to Eden by Anne Rampling
- Produced by: Garry Marshall; Edward K. Milkis
- Starring: Dana Delany; Paul Mercurio; Iman; Stuart Wilson; Héctor Elizondo; Rosie O'Donnell; Dan Aykroyd
- Cinematography: Theo van de Sande
- Edited by: David Finfer
- Music by: Patrick Doyle
- Distributed by: Savoy Pictures
- Release date: October 14, 1994
- Running time: 114 minutes
- Country: United States
- Language: English
- Budget: $25-30 million
- Box office: $6.8 million

Exit to Eden is a 1994 American comedy thriller film directed by Garry Marshall and adapted to the screen by Deborah Amelon and Bob Brunner from Anne Rice's novel of the same name. The original music score was composed by Patrick Doyle.

Dana Delany stars as Lisa Emerson (named Lisa Kelly in the book) and Paul Mercurio plays Elliot Slater. Half of the film consists of a new comedic detective story line written by the director. Several new characters were also created, including Dan Aykroyd and Rosie O'Donnell as police officers pursuing diamond thieves to the Eden resort.

Exit to Eden was released by Savoy Pictures on October 14, 1994. The film received negative reviews from critics and was a box office bomb, grossing $6.8 million against a $25-30 million budget.

== Plot ==
Elliot Slater is a young, attractive, Australian professional photographer living in Southern California. Having always been uncomfortable with his sexual proclivities, which tend toward the BDSM realm, he signs up for a dominatrix-themed vacation on a private tropical island known as "Eden" in the hopes of working through his discomfort.

Unbeknownst to him, before embarking on his journey of sexual discovery, he has unwittingly photographed an international jewel thief of whom no other photos exist. The jewel thief Omar and his criminal partner Nina are intent on recovering the film in order to retain Omar's anonymity.

They follow the photographer to the island resort run by the dominatrix, Mistress Lisa Emerson, posing as vacationers. Following a tip that Omar is on the island, undercover police officers Fred Lavery and Sheila Kingston also arrive, Sheila in the guise of a vacationer and Fred as a handyman.

In the course of Elliot's experiences as Mistress Lisa's personal submissive, including a scene where she ties him up and fondles his naked body (especially his bare buttocks, which she also spanks), the two begin to fall in love. The action comes to a climax on a quick trip to New Orleans, where Lisa reluctantly admits her feelings for Elliot, all the while being tailed by Omar, who attempts to kill them.

Fred and Sheila save the day, sending Omar and Nina to jail, and receive commendations for solving the case. Elliot returns to Eden and proposes to Lisa, who says yes. Also, the submissive who spoke to Sheila makes good on her request: he has her house painted.

== Cast ==
- Dana Delany as Lisa Emerson
- Paul Mercurio as Elliot Slater
- Rosie O'Donnell as Sheila Kingston
- Dan Aykroyd as Fred Lavery
- Héctor Elizondo as Dr. Martin Helifax; credited "As usual Hector Elizondo"
- Stuart Wilson as Omar
- Iman as Nina Blackstone
- Sean O'Bryan as Tommy Miller
- Stephanie Niznik as Diana
- Phil Redrow as Richard
- Sandra Taylor as Riba
- Julie Hughes as Julie
- Laura Harring as M.C. Kindra
- Deborah Pratt as Dr. Williams
- Laurelle Mehus as Heidi
- Tom Hines as Nolan
- Alison Moir as Kitty
- James Patrick Stuart as James
- Rosemary Forsyth as Mrs. Brady
- John Schneider as Professor Collins
- Donna Dixon as Bonnie
- Don Hood as Lisa's Father
- Rio Hackford as Topless Customer
- Mel Novak as Walker's Henchman
- Bonnie Aarons as the Prostitute
- Lynda Goodfriend as Linda

== Production ==
The whips used and shown in detail were created by Janette Heartwood. This was the last film produced by Edward K. Milkis before his death in 1996.

== Reception ==
The film garnered attention during its release because of the BDSM themes, full frontal female nudity (including Delany), and because of the high profiles of the director, cast members, and the author. Promotional materials for the film included photos of Delany in dominatrix attire.

It was panned by critics, who expressed disappointment and confusion over the combination of the original story and the comedic elements. The film maintains a 5% "rotten" rating at Rotten Tomatoes based on 19 reviews, with an average score of 3.2/10. Roger Ebert gave the film ½ star out of four possible stars, writing that "it's supposed to be a kinky sex comedy, but it keeps getting distracted. On the first page of my notes, I wrote 'Starts slow.' On the second page, I wrote 'Boring.' On the third page, I wrote 'Endless!' On the fourth page, I wrote: 'Bite-size Shredded Wheat, skim milk, cantaloupe, frozen peas, toilet paper, salad stuff, pick up laundry.' The movie is based on a novel by Anne Rice, who is said to know a lot about bizarre sexual practices. Either she learned it all after writing this book, or the director, Garry Marshall, just didn't have his heart in it. The movie is not only dumb and ill-constructed, but tragically miscast. The actors look so uncomfortable they could be experiencing alarming intestinal symptoms." He added:

Anne Rice recently took out two-page spreads in Variety and the New York Times to announce that she has seen the film of her novel Interview with the Vampire, and thinks it is a masterpiece. I don't think we should look for her ad about Exit to Eden, not even in the classifieds."

Time Out described the film as a "sexploiter [that] makes Zalman King's 'women's fantasy' movies seem sophisticated and daring." James Berardinelli wrote that the film "has all the ingredients of late night cable fare. The film, which invites a decidedly-unfavorable comparison to John Duigan's Sirens, isn't so much repugnant as it is disappointing. Its R rating also raises questions about the basic inconsistency of the MPAA. Other, non-mainstream films have gotten NC-17's for a lot less. Perhaps the Association tempered their rating because they found Exit to Eden amusing. If so, they're probably the only ones." Janet Maslin of The New York Times called the film "an incredible mess, a movie that changes gears so often and so nonsensically it seems to have been edited in a blender."

The film was not a financial success either, opening with a gross for the weekend of $3 million and a total gross of $6.8 million, which led to the company recognising a loss.

One controversy occurred when it was initially banned by the Saskatchewan Film and Video Classification Board. Critics were puzzled by the banning, as Saskatchewan was the only jurisdiction known to have kept the film out of theaters. After a brief media flurry, the Board lifted the ban a week later.

=== Year-end worst-of lists ===
- 2nd – Janet Maslin, The New York Times
- 3rd – Robert Denerstein, Rocky Mountain News
- 4th – John Hurley, Staten Island Advance
- 8th – Glenn Lovell, San Jose Mercury News
- Top 10 (listed alphabetically, not ranked) – Mike Mayo, The Roanoke Times
- Top 18 (alphabetically listed, not ranked) – Michael Mills, The Palm Beach Post
- Dishonorable mention – William Arnold, Seattle Post-Intelligencer
- #10 Worst - Michael Medved, Sneak Previews

=== Awards and nominations ===
O'Donnell won the Razzie Award for Worst Supporting Actress for this film, Aykroyd earned nominations for Worst Supporting Actor, and both O'Donnell and Aykroyd were nominated as Worst Screen Couple. At the 1994 Stinkers Bad Movie Awards, O'Donnell was also nominated for Worst Actress.

== Home media ==
The film was released on VHS tape (NTSC) in May 1995, on DVD (NTSC Region 1, 4:3 Full Frame) in April 2002 and again (PAL Region 2) in 2003 (German Version "Undercover Cop" with German and English language sound).
