= Stan Rice =

American professor, poet and artist (1942–2002)

- Born: November 7, 1942; Dallas, Texas, U.S.
- Died: December 9, 2002 (aged 60); New Orleans, Louisiana, U.S.
- Occupations: Poet, painter
- Spouse: Anne O'Brien (m. 1961)
- Children: 2, including Christopher Rice
- Website: www.stanrice.com

Stan Rice (November 7, 1942 – December 9, 2002) was an American professor, poet and artist. He was the husband of author Anne Rice.

== Biography ==
Rice was born in Dallas, Texas, in 1942. He met his future wife Anne O'Brien in high school. They briefly attended North Texas State University together, before marrying in 1961 and moving to San Francisco in 1962, to enroll at San Francisco State University, where they both earned their bachelor's and master's degrees. Rice was a professor of English and Creative Writing at San Francisco State University. In 1977, he received the Academy of American Poets' Edgar Allan Poe Award for Whiteboy, and in subsequent years was also the recipient of the Joseph Henry Jackson Award, as well as a writing fellowship from the National Endowment for the Arts. Rice retired after 22 years as Chairman of the Creative Writing program as well as assistant director of the Poetry Center in 1989.

It was the death of his and Anne's first child, daughter Michele (1966–1972), at age six of leukemia, which led to Stan Rice becoming a published author. His first book of poems, based on his daughter's illness and death, was titled Some Lamb, and was published in 1975. He encouraged his wife to quit her work as a waitress, cook and theater usher in order to devote herself full-time to her writing, and both eventually encouraged their son, novelist Christopher Rice, to become a published author as well.

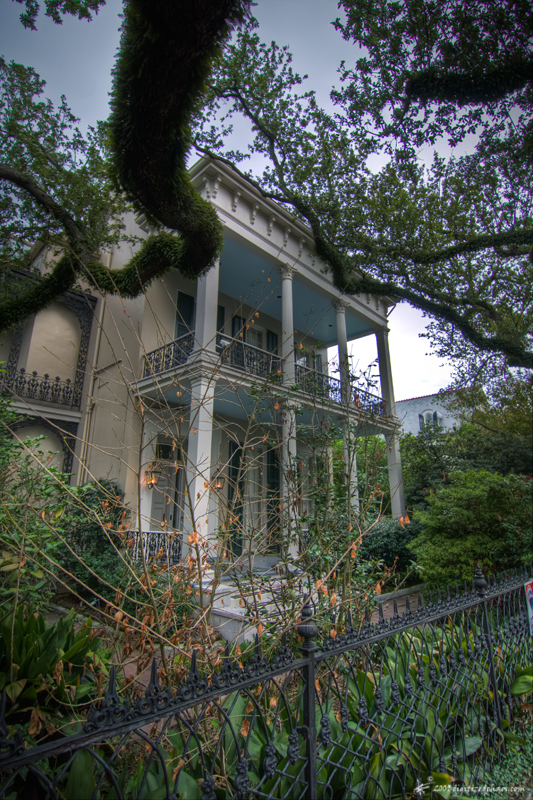
The Brevard-Rice House in New Orleans, purchased by Stan and Anne Rice in 1989.

Rice, his wife and his son moved to the Garden District, New Orleans, in 1988, where he eventually opened the Stan Rice Gallery. In 1989, they purchased the Brevard-Rice House, 1239 First Street, built in 1857 for Albert Hamilton Brevard.

Stan Rice's paintings are represented in the collections of the Ogden Museum of Southern Art and the New Orleans Museum of Art. He had a one-person show at the James W. Palmer Gallery, Vassar College, Poughkeepsie, New York. The Art Galleries of Southeastern Louisiana presented an exhibition of selected paintings in March 2005. Prospective plans are underway to present exhibitions of Rice's paintings at various locations in Mexico.

In Prism of the Night, Anne Rice said of Stan: "He's a model to me of a man who doesn't look to heaven or hell to justify his feelings about life itself. His capacity for action is admirable. Very early on he said to me, 'What more could you ask for than life itself'?"

Poet Deborah Garrison was Rice's editor at Alfred A. Knopf for his 2002 collection, Red to the Rind, which was dedicated to novelist son Christopher, in whose success as a writer his father greatly rejoiced. Garrison said of Rice: "Stan really attempted to kind of stare down the world, and I admire that."

Knopf's Victoria Wilson, who edited Anne's novels and worked with Stan Rice on his 1997 book, Paintings, was particularly impressed by his refusal to sell his artworks, saying, "The great thing about Stan is that he refused to play the game as a painter, and he refused to play the game as a poet."

== Personal life ==
Rice was an atheist. (Note: Reviewing Anne Rice's Christ the Lord: Out of Egypt, Matt Thorne noted: "In a long author's note, Rice explains how she experienced an old-fashioned, strict Roman Catholic childhood in the 1940s and 1950s, before leaving the Church at 18 due to sexual pressure and her desire to read authors she considered forbidden to her, such as Kierkegaard, Sartre, and Camus. Two years later she married a passionate atheist, the poet and artist Stan Rice, and in 1974, began a literary career that she retrospectively views as representing her 'quest for meaning in a world without God'.")

== Death ==
Stan Rice died of brain cancer at age 60, on December 9, 2002.

Rice is entombed in Metairie Cemetery in New Orleans.

== Poetry collections ==
- Some Lamb (1975)
- Whiteboy (1976) (earned the Edgar Allan Poe Award from the Academy of American Poets)
- Body of Work (1983)
- Singing Yet: New and Selected Poems (1992)
- Fear Itself (1997)
- The Radiance of Pigs (1999)
- Red to the Rind (2002)
- False Prophet (2003) (Posthumous)

== Poetry video recordings ==
Two series of recordings – one from 1973 at San Francisco State University and the other from 1996 at the poet's New Orleans home by filmmaker Blair Murphy – capturing Stan Rice reading several of his poems are on the YouTube site dedicated to the poet.

== Other books ==
- Paintings (1997)
