= Lasher (novel) =

1993 novel by Anne Rice

- First edition cover of Lasher (1993)
- Author: Anne Rice
- Language: English
- Series: Lives of the Mayfair Witches
- Genre: Gothic; supernatural; horror; fantasy
- Publisher: Knopf
- Publication date: September 12, 1993
- Pages: 592
- ISBN: 0-679-41295-6
- Preceded by: The Witching Hour
- Followed by: Taltos

Lasher is a 1993 Gothic horror novel by Anne Rice, the second novel in the Lives of the Mayfair Witches trilogy and the direct sequel to The Witching Hour (1990). It was followed by Taltos (1994).

== Plot ==
Rowan has disappeared and Michael, feeling betrayed by her, has sunk into a depression, helped along by the useless drugs prescribed to him after his near-drowning. The sexually adventurous Mona Mayfair, a precocious teenage cousin also descended from Julien, is a powerful witch. She seduces Michael, who snaps out of his stupor and commits himself to finding Rowan, who he is now convinced did not leave willingly. Rowan, meanwhile, is essentially Lasher's prisoner. His first two attempts at impregnating her are failures ending in miscarriage, but he is successful the third time. Traveling with Lasher throughout Europe, Rowan manages to send DNA samples to colleagues in San Francisco. They discover that Lasher is a completely different species, later identified as a Taltos. Rowan herself has a genetic abnormality, polyploidy, or 92 chromosomes, which is probably what made Lasher's quasi-supernatural birth at all possible in the first place.

In the past, Julien finds himself to be the only known male Mayfair witch, and learns how to manipulate the spirit Lasher. Julien impregnates numerous Mayfair women as part of Lasher's scheme of inbreeding, which Julien believes is a means to keep power in the family but is actually the way by which Lasher hopes to resurrect himself in flesh. Rowan returns to America with Lasher, who sets out to impregnate other female members of the Mayfair family. All attempts are unsuccessful as the women immediately miscarry and hemorrhage to death. Rowan manages to escape Lasher, and after hitchhiking to Louisiana, she collapses in a field and gives birth to Emaleth, a female Taltos. Rowan's last words to Emaleth are to find Michael, which she sets out to do, thinking that Rowan has died. Rowan is found and is rushed to a nearby hospital in a state of toxic shock. An emergency hysterectomy is performed to save her life, eliminating any chance of her ever giving birth again. She is taken home to Michael, where she remains in a deep coma.

Lasher tells Michael and Aaron his story of his past life. Born to Anne Boleyn, the second wife of Henry VIII of England, and a man from Donnelaith, Scotland, Lasher is believed to be a saint known as Ashlar. He is quickly taken away by his father, who is the son of the Earl of Donnelaith, and from there he is sent to Italy to become a priest. Lasher returns to Scotland after Elizabeth I takes the throne, and is killed there while performing Christmas Mass by followers of the Protestant reformer John Knox. His next memory is the summoning of his spirit by the witch Suzanne Mayfair in Donnelaith. When Lasher's story is complete, Michael kills him and buries him under the great oak in the yard. Michael discovers Emaleth in Rowan's room, feeding her mother the highly nutritious milk from her breasts. Rowan is revived, but upon seeing Emaleth before her, panics and screams at Michael to kill her. Michael refuses to, so Rowan grabs a gun and shoots her daughter in the head. Rowan immediately realizes what she has done, and crying for her daughter, insists that she be the one to bury her alongside Lasher.

== Reception ==
Lasher debuted at No. 2 on The New York Times Best Seller list, and remained in that position for three weeks, spending a total of 17 weeks on the list. Publishers Weekly called Lasher "another vast, transcontinental saga of witchcraft and demonism in the tradition of Gothic melodrama." The publication noted of the novel, "Long sections ramble without a compelling point of view, and are dampened by stock elements: clichéd wind storms, sexy witches, the endless supply of money the Talamasca has at its disposal. At times, Lasher is too much in evidence (rattling the china, gnashing his teeth) to be frightening. But embedded in this antique demonism is a contemporary tale of incest and family abuse that achieves resonance," and added that "Rice's characters rise above the more wooden plot machinations with an ironic and modern complexity", and that "the novel is compelling through its exhaustive monumentality.
