= Cry to Heaven =

1982 novel by Anne Rice

- First edition cover
- Author: Anne Rice
- Language: English
- Genre: Historical fiction, Bildungsroman
- Published: September 12, 1982
- Publisher: Knopf
- Publication place: United States
- Media type: Print (hardcover & paperback)
- Pages: 533
- ISBN: 978-0-394-52351-4
- OCLC: 8345254

Cry to Heaven is a novel by American author Anne Rice published by Alfred A. Knopf in 1982. Taking place in eighteenth-century Italy, it follows the paths of two unlikely collaborators: a Venetian noble and a maestro castrato from Calabria, both trying to succeed in the world of the opera.

== Plot ==
Set in eighteenth-century Italy, Cry to Heaven focuses on two characters, peasant-born Guido Maffeo, who is castrated at the age of six to preserve his soprano voice, and fifteen-year-old Tonio Treschi, the last son of a noble family from the Republic of Venice, whose father, Andrea, is a member of the Council of Three of La Serenissima. Although Guido becomes a star of the opera as a teenager, he loses his voice at eighteen, as many castrati did. After a suicide attempt, he becomes a music teacher in the Naples conservatorio. Tonio, on the other hand, learns that his older brother Carlo was exiled for embarrassing the family. Although Andrea attempts to cut Carlo out of the family, Carlo returns after Andrea's death, and plots to regain his original position. Revealing that Tonio is actually his illegitimate son, he has Tonio castrated, and sends him off with Guido to study in Naples.

Although everyone in Venice is inclined to believe that Carlo was behind his castration, Tonio cannot accuse him of the crime because doing so would result in the extinction of the Treschi family. After some soul-searching, he decides to remain in Naples and study under Guido, holding off on revenge until after Carlo and his mother (also Carlo's lover and later wife) have children to ensure the family line.

By the power of Tonio's almost inhuman soprano voice, Guido is roused from his depression, and takes him as a star student. Tonio progresses in his lessons extremely quickly. Guido also has Tonio perform some of his original compositions, which begin to impress audiences at the conservatorio.

Tonio, for his part, struggles to come to terms with his castrato status; in his own mind, he is "less than a man". At first, he finds it difficult even to associate with his fellow castrati. As time goes on, he has a love affair with another castrato boy, Domenico, and after Domenico leaves, with Guido himself. He comes to dominate the conservatorio—in addition to being a star student, he soon befriends all the boys his age, and becomes something of a leader and confidant.

Tonio also continues his studies in fencing and firearms, which, in Guido's words, make him into a "hero" to his fellow students, especially after, in self-defense, he kills a student who vowed to kill him. As he was raised to be a gentleman, and because he was castrated relatively late in life, he continues to act like a man, unlike the more effeminate poses of castrati boys. Despite the fact he is a castrato, even local noblemen come to respect him both as a sparring partner and as a friend.

However, Guido and others need to scheme to get Tonio, finally, out of the conservatorio and onto the stage. After his debut, Guido and Tonio travel to Rome for his operatic premiere. There he gains the patronage of a powerful cardinal, Calvino, and befriends a powerful count from Florence, di Stefano. Although he is almost booed off the stage for upstaging the operatic star Bettichino, he proves a great success, and both he and Guido have bright futures in front of themselves. Tonio even becomes lovers with an English noblewoman and widow, Christina, seemingly restoring him to his former status.

Nonetheless, Tonio is unable to break free of the desire for revenge against Carlo. After having two children by Carlo, Tonio's mother, Marianna, dies. Soon afterwards—and before his Mardi Gras opera performance—hitmen sent by Carlo try to kill him. Against the wishes of all his friends, Tonio vows to return in time for an Easter opera, then disappears.

In Venice, Carlo has become a pathetic, alcoholic wreck. Disguised as a woman (a trick he learned for the opera), Tonio succeeds in "seducing" his father and capturing him. Intoxicated, Carlo not only curses ever coming back to Venice, but also wants to take Tonio's place, finding the city decadent and confining. Although he promises never to try and hurt Tonio again, he attempts to kill him the second he has the opportunity. In response, Tonio finally kills Carlo. He then returns to his friends, at last able to fully pursue his life.

== Development and publication ==
With the completion of her second novel, The Feast of All Saints (1979), American author Anne Rice started her research for another, which she planned to set during the French Revolution with a violinist as its protagonist. Rice, however, changed her mind when she read about castrated opera singers and a Naples conservatory during her research, and became interested in them, seeing potential in how the Italian society viewed them as less than men, yet flocked to their opera performances. Rice did historical research for Cry to Heaven: W.J. Henderson's Early History of Singing provided the foundation for how Guido taught singing, and in Vernon Lee's Studies in the 18th Century in Italy, she read about Achilles en Sciro by Metastasio, which she later used for Tonio's debut in Rome. A 1972 recording "Baroque Venice, Music of Gabrieli, Bassano, Monteverdi" directly inspired Tonio's musical experience at San Marco, while Alessandro Scarlatti's The Garden of Love inspired the duet of Tonio and Christina—the only part of the novel written to music. For the settings, she relied on her travels to Venice and Rome a few years earlier, and read the diary of German author Johann Wolfgang von Goethe detailing his trip to Naples, although she found a lack of material on the conservatories.

Rice wrote the first two hundred pages of Cry to Heaven as a contrast to Tonio's life as a castrato for the rest of the novel. She quickened her narrative pacing to suit her audience, in an attempt to remedy an issue that she felt had hindered the success of The Feast of All Saints (1979). Parts of her largely unpublished novella Nicholas and Jean (1966) were incorporated into Cry to Heaven, among them a female role being played by a man. With her previous novel's failure to become a bestseller and her Simon & Schuster editor's lack of interest in Cry to Heaven, Rice eventually returned to Alfred A. Knopf, the publisher of her debut novel Interview with the Vampire (1976); at the time, two-thirds of the novel had been completed. She struggled with deciding where to end the novel. Cry to Heaven was published in October 1982. In retrospect, she felt that the novel had very little spontaneity, was too "calculated", and that the historical aspect of it took on too much importance, as in The Feast of All Saints. After its publication, Rice made an effort to return to the spontaneity with which that she had written Interview with the Vampire.

== Critical reception ==
Cry to Heaven sold fewer hardcover copies than The Feast of All Saints, which had sold fewer than 20,000 copies in hardcover. Cry to Heaven, like The Feast of All Saints, did not reach the same level of success that Interview with the Vampire did.

Cry to Heaven received mixed reviews. The Washington Post's Joseph McLellan called it "an absorbing look at a fascinating and little-known world." McLellan wrote that Rice's historical research, writing, and subject matter of opera and castrati distinguished it from other historical novels. Alice Hoffman, in her review for The New York Times Book Review, described it as "bold and erotic, laced with luxury, sexual tension, music". However, she felt that Rice falsely increased narrative tension through "melodramatic dialogue, odd elongation of words, [and] a confusing switch of narrative focus". Michiko Kakutani of The New York Times called it a "dark, humid melodrama" and enjoyed the historical details and Tonio's "emotional development", although she wrote that the secondary characters were two-dimensional and superficial. Additionally, she stated that Rice's frequent foreshadowing and the clichéd and emotionally overwrought dialogue detracted from the novel's appeal. Writing for The Los Angeles Times Book Review, Pat Hilton wrote that, excepting the conclusion, Cry to Heaven was "satisfying", and felt that its questions about masculinity were contemporary.

== Film adaptation ==
In November 2025, Tom Ford was reported to be directing, writing, and producing a feature film adaptation of the novel. The film is currently in pre-production and will begin principal photography in January 2026. The film will also be the acting debut of Adele, who stars alongside an ensemble cast of Nicholas Hoult, Aaron Taylor-Johnson, Ciarán Hinds, George MacKay, Mark Strong, Colin Firth, Paul Bettany, Owen Cooper, Hunter Schafer, Thandiwe Newton, Théodore Pellerin, Daryl McCormack, Cassian Bilton, and Lux Pascal.

== See also ==
- Farinelli
- Farinelli (film)
