= Anne Rice =

American author (1941–2021)

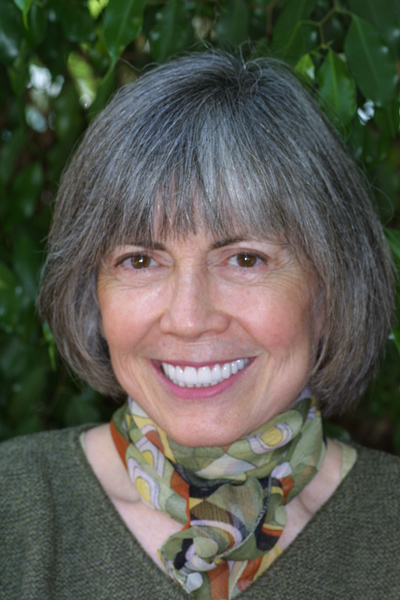
- Rice in 2006
- Born: Howard Allen Frances O'Brien; October 4, 1941; New Orleans, Louisiana, U.S.
- Died: December 11, 2021 (aged 80); Rancho Mirage, California, U.S.
- Education: San Francisco State University (BA, MA)
- Occupation: Novelist
- Spouse: Stan Rice (m. 1961; died 2002)
- Children: Michele Rice; Christopher Rice
- Writing career
- Pen name: Anne Rampling; A. N. Roquelaure
- Genres: Gothic; horror; erotic literature; Christian novel; fantasy
- Website: annerice.com

Anne Rice (born Howard Allen Frances O'Brien; October 4, 1941 – December 11, 2021) was an American author of Gothic fiction, erotic literature, and Bible fiction. She is best known for writing The Vampire Chronicles. She later adapted the first volume in the series into a commercially successful film, Interview with the Vampire (1994).

Born in New Orleans, Rice spent much of her early life in the city before moving to Texas, and later to San Francisco and Berkeley, California. She was raised in an observant Catholic family but became an agnostic as a young adult.

She began her professional writing career with the publication of Interview with the Vampire (1976), while living in California, and began writing sequels to the novel in the 1980s. In the mid-2000s, following a publicized return to Catholicism, she published the novels Christ the Lord: Out of Egypt and Christ the Lord: The Road to Cana, fictionalized accounts of certain incidents in the life of Jesus. Several years later she distanced herself from organized religion, while maintaining a Christian faith in her personal life. She later considered herself a secular humanist.

Rice's books have sold over 100 million copies, making her one of the best-selling authors of modern times. While reaction to her early works was initially mixed, she gained a better reception by critics in the 1980s. Her writing style and the literary content of her works have been analyzed by literary commentators.

She was married to poet and painter Stan Rice for 41 years, from 1961 until his death from brain cancer in 2002 at age 60. She and Stan had two children, Michele, who died of leukemia at age five, and Christopher, who became a writer.

Rice also wrote books such as The Feast of All Saints (adapted for television in 2001) and Servant of the Bones, which formed the basis of a 2011 comic book miniseries. Several books from The Vampire Chronicles have been adapted as comics and manga by various publishers. American television network AMC have adapted the first of the Vampire Chronicles books into a critically acclaimed series, titled Interview with the Vampire for the first two seasons and now The Vampire Lestat for the third. She also wrote erotic fiction, published under the pen names Anne Rampling and A. N. Roquelaure. These books included Exit to Eden, which was later adapted into a 1994 film of the same title.

== Early life ==
=== New Orleans and Texas ===
Born in New Orleans on October 4, 1941, Howard Allen Frances O'Brien was the second of four daughters of parents of Irish Catholic descent, Howard O'Brien (1917–1991) and Katherine "Kay" Allen O'Brien (1908–1956). Her father, a naval veteran of World War II and lifelong resident of New Orleans, worked as a personnel executive for the U.S. Postal Service and authored one novel, The Impulsive Imp, which was published posthumously. Her older sister, Alice Borchardt, later became an author of fantasy and historical romance novels. She was the cousin of cinematographer Allen Daviau.

Rice spent most of her youth in New Orleans, which forms the backdrop against which many of her works are set. She and her family lived in the rented home of her maternal grandmother, Alice Allen, known as "Mamma Allen", at 2301 St. Charles Avenue. The street featured the city's best real estate, and runs parallel to and just five blocks from Magazine Street, the central artery of the Irish Channel; Rice said the section was widely considered a "Catholic Ghetto", illustrating New Orleans' historical juxtaposition of rich and poor, and Black and White neighborhoods. Allen, who became a domestic worker shortly after separating from her alcoholic husband, was an important early influence in Rice's life, keeping the family and household together as Rice's mother sank deeper into alcoholism. Allen died in 1949, but the O'Briens remained in her home until 1956. They moved to 2524 St. Charles Avenue, a former rectory, convent, and school owned by the parish, to be closer to both the church and support for Katherine's addiction. As a young child, Rice studied at St. Alphonsus School, a Catholic institution previously attended by her father.

About her male given names, Rice said:

Well, my birth name is Howard Allen because apparently my mother thought it was a good idea to name me Howard. My father's name was Howard, she wanted to name me after Howard, and she thought it was a very interesting thing to do. She was a bit of a Bohemian, a bit of mad woman, a bit of a genius, and a great deal of a great teacher. And she had the idea that naming a woman Howard was going to give that woman an unusual advantage in the world.

According to the authorized biography Prism of the Night, by Katherine Ramsland, Rice's father was the source of his daughter's birth name: "Thinking back to the days when his own name had been associated with girls, and perhaps in an effort to give it away, Howard named the little girl Howard Allen Frances O'Brien." Rice became "Anne" on her first day of school, when a nun asked her what her name was. She told the nun "Anne", which she considered a pretty name. Her mother, who was with her, let it go without correcting her, knowing how self-conscious her daughter was of her real name. From that day on, everyone she knew addressed her as "Anne", and her name was legally changed in 1947. Rice was confirmed in the Catholic Church when she was twelve years old and took the full name Howard Allen Frances Alphonsus Liguori O'Brien, adding the names of a saint and of an aunt, who was a nun. She said: "I was honored to have my aunt's name, but it was my burden and joy as a child to have strange names".

When Rice was 15 years old, her mother died as a result of alcoholism. Soon afterward, she and her sisters were placed by their father in St. Joseph Academy. Rice described St. Joseph's as "something out of Jane Eyre ... a dilapidated, awful, medieval type of place. I really hated it and wanted to leave. I felt betrayed by my father."

In November 1957, Rice's father married Dorothy Van Bever. On the subject of the couple's first meeting, Rice recalled, "My father wrote her a formal letter inviting her to lunch which I hand-delivered to her house ... I was so nervous. In the note he enclosed a pin which she was to wear if she accepted the invitation. The next day she had the pin on." In 1958, when Rice was sixteen, her father moved the family to north Texas, purchasing their first home in Richardson. Rice first met her future husband, Stan Rice, in a journalism class while they were both students at Richardson High School.

=== San Francisco and Berkeley ===
Graduating from Richardson High in 1959, Rice completed her first year at Texas Woman's University in Denton and transferred to North Texas State College for her second year. She dropped out when she ran out of money and was unable to find employment. Soon after, she moved to San Francisco and stayed with the family of a friend until she found work as an insurance claims processor. She persuaded her former roommate from Texas Woman's University, Ginny Mathis, to join her, and they found an apartment in the Haight-Ashbury district. Mathis acquired a job at the same insurance company as Rice. Soon after, they began taking night courses at University of San Francisco, an all-male Jesuit school that allowed women to take classes at night. For Easter vacation Anne returned home to Texas, rekindling her relationship with Stan Rice. They married on October 14, 1961, in Denton, Texas, soon after she turned 20 years old, and when he was just weeks from his 19th birthday.

The Rices moved back to San Francisco in 1962, experiencing the birth of the hippie movement firsthand as they lived in the Haight-Ashbury district, Berkeley, and later the Castro District. "I'm a totally conservative person", she later told The New York Times: "In the middle of Haight-Ashbury in the 1960s, I was typing away while everybody was dropping acid and smoking grass. I was known as my own square." Rice attended San Francisco State University and obtained a B.A. in political science in 1964. Their daughter Michele, later nicknamed "Mouse", was born to the couple on September 21, 1966, and Rice later interrupted her graduate studies at SFSU to become a PhD candidate at the University of California, Berkeley. She soon became disenchanted with the emphasis on literary criticism and the language requirements. In her words: "I wanted to be a writer, not a literature student."

Rice returned to San Francisco State in 1970 to finish her studies in creative writing and graduated with an M.A. in 1972. Stan Rice became an instructor at San Francisco State shortly after receiving his own M.A. in creative writing from the institution, and later chaired the creative writing department before retiring in 1988. Her daughter was diagnosed with acute granulocytic leukemia in 1970, while Rice was still in the graduate program. Rice later described having a prophetic dream—months before Michele became ill—that her daughter was dying from "something wrong with her blood". Michele died in 1972, shortly before she would have turned six.

Rice's son Christopher was born in Berkeley, California, in 1978; he has become a best-selling author in his own right, publishing his first novel at the age of 22. Rice, an admitted alcoholic, and her husband, Stan Rice, quit drinking in mid-1979 so their son would not have the life that she had as a child. In 2008, Rice posted a YouTube video to celebrate 28 years of her sobriety.

== Writing career ==
=== Influences ===
Rice cited Charles Dickens, Virginia Woolf, John Milton, Ernest Hemingway, William Shakespeare, the Brontë sisters, Jean-Paul Sartre, Henry James, Arthur Conan Doyle, H. Rider Haggard, and Stephen King as influences on her work. She repeatedly returned to King's Firestarter for inspiration: "I study the novel Firestarter whenever I'm blocked. Reading the first few pages of Firestarter helps to get me going."

=== Interview with the Vampire ===
In 1973, while still grieving the loss of her daughter (1966–1972), Rice took a previously written short story and turned it into her first novel, the bestselling Interview with the Vampire. She based her vampires on Gloria Holden's character in Dracula's Daughter: "It established to me what vampires were—these elegant, tragic, sensitive people. I was really just going with that feeling when writing Interview With the Vampire. I didn't do a lot of research." After completing the novel and following many rejections from publishers, Rice developed obsessive–compulsive disorder (OCD). She became obsessed with germs, thinking that she contaminated everything she touched, engaged in frequent and obsessive hand washing and obsessively checked locks on windows and doors. Of this period, Rice says, "What you see when you're in that state is every single flaw in our hygiene and you can't control it and you go crazy."

In August 1974, after a year of therapy for her OCD, Rice attended the Squaw Valley Writer's Conference at Olympic Valley (formerly Squaw Valley), conducted by writer Ray Nelson. While at the conference, Rice met her future literary agent, Phyllis Seidel. In October 1974, Seidel sold the publishing rights to Interview with the Vampire to Alfred A. Knopf for a $12,000 advance of the hardcover rights, at a time when most new authors were receiving $2,000 advances. Interview with the Vampire was published in May 1976. In 1977, the Rices traveled to both Europe and Egypt for the first time.

=== Other works ===
Following the publication of Interview with the Vampire, while living in California, Rice wrote two historical novels, The Feast of All Saints and Cry to Heaven, along with three erotic novels (The Claiming of Sleeping Beauty, Beauty's Punishment, and Beauty's Release) under the pseudonym A. N. Roquelaure, and two more under the pseudonym Anne Rampling (Exit to Eden and Belinda). Rice then returned to the vampire genre with The Vampire Lestat and The Queen of the Damned, her bestselling sequels to Interview with the Vampire.

Shortly after her June 1988 return to New Orleans, Rice penned The Witching Hour as an expression of her joy at coming home. Rice also continued her Vampire Chronicles series, which later grew to encompass ten novels, and followed up on The Witching Hour with Lasher and Taltos, completing the Lives of the Mayfair Witches trilogy. She also published Violin, a tale of a ghostly haunting, in 1997. Rice appeared on an episode of The Real World: New Orleans that aired in 2000.

Rice began another series called Christ the Lord: Out of Egypt, published in 2005, chronicling the life of Jesus. After moving to Rancho Mirage, California in 2006, Rice wrote a second volume Christ the Lord: The Road to Cana, published in March 2008, and was working on a third Christ the Lord: Kingdom of Heaven in November 2008. She also wrote the first two books in her Songs of the Seraphim series, Angel Time and Of Love and Evil, and her memoir Called Out of Darkness: A Spiritual Confession.

On March 9, 2014, Rice announced on her son Christopher's radio show, The Dinner Party with Christopher Rice and Eric Shaw Quinn, that she had completed another book in the Vampire Chronicles, titled, Prince Lestat, a "true sequel" to Queen of the Damned. The book was released on October 28, 2014. In 2015, a sequel to the Sleeping Beauty trilogy, Beauty's Kingdom, was released.

== Reception and analysis ==
Following its debut in 1976, Interview with the Vampire received mixed reviews from critics at this time, causing Rice to retreat temporarily from the supernatural genre. When The Vampire Lestat debuted in 1985, reaction—both from critics and from readers—was more positive, and the first hardcover edition of the book sold 75,000 copies. Upon its publication in 1988, The Queen of the Damned was given an initial hardcover printing of 405,000 copies. The novel was a main selection of the Literary Guild of America for 1988, and reached the No. 1 spot on The New York Times Best Seller list, staying on the list for more than four months.

Rice's novels are well regarded by many members of the LGBT+ community, some of whom have perceived her vampire characters as allegorical symbols of isolation and social alienation. Similarly, a reviewer writing for The Boston Globe, observed that the vampires of her novels represent "the walking alienated, those of us who, by choice or not, dwell on the fringe". On the subject, Rice commented: "From the beginning, I've had gay fans, and gay readers who felt that my works involved a sustained gay allegory ... I didn't set out to do that, but that was what they perceived. So even when Christopher was a little baby, I had gay readers and gay friends and knew gay people, and lived in the Castro district of San Francisco, which was a gay neighborhood."

Rice's writings have also been identified as having had a major impact on later developments within the genre of vampire fiction. "Rice turns vampire conventions inside out", wrote Susan Ferraro of The New York Times. "Because Rice identifies with the vampire instead of the victim (reversing the usual focus), the horror for the reader springs from the realization of the monster within the self. Moreover, Rice's vampires are loquacious philosophers who spend much of eternity debating the nature of good and evil."

Rice's writing style has been heavily analyzed. Ferraro, in a statement typical of many reviewers, described her prose as "florid, both lurid and lyrical, and full of sensuous detail". Others have criticized her writing style as both verbose and overly philosophical. Author William Patrick Day comments that her writing is often "long, convoluted, and imprecise". The New York Times critic Michiko Kakutani wrote: "Anne Rice has what might best be described as a Gothic imagination crossed with a campy taste for the decadent and the bizarre."

== Personal life ==
=== Back to New Orleans and Catholicism ===
In June 1988, following the success of The Vampire Lestat and with The Queen of the Damned about to be published, the Rices purchased a second home in New Orleans, the Brevard–Rice House, built in 1857 for Albert Hamilton Brevard. Stan took a leave of absence from teaching, and together they moved to New Orleans. Within months, they decided to make it their permanent home.

Rice returned to the Catholic Church in 1998 after decades of atheism. She fell into a coma, later determined to be caused by diabetic ketoacidosis (DKA), on December 14, 1998, and nearly died. She was later diagnosed with diabetes mellitus type 1, and was insulin-dependent. Following the advice of her husband, Rice underwent gastric bypass surgery shortly after his death and shed 103 pounds in 2003.

Rice nearly died again from an intestinal blockage or bowel obstruction, a common complication of gastric bypass surgery, in 2004. In 2005, Newsweek reported: "She came close to death last year, when she had surgery for an intestinal blockage, and also back in 1998, when she went into a sudden diabetic coma; that same year she returned to the Roman Catholic Church, which she'd left at 18." Her return did not come with a full embrace of the Church's stances on social issues; Rice remained a vocal supporter of equality for gay men and lesbians (including marriage rights), as well as abortion rights and birth control, writing extensively on such issues.

While promoting her book Christ the Lord: Out of Egypt in October 2005, Rice announced in Newsweek that she would use her life and talent of writing to glorify her belief in God, but she did not renounce her earlier works, citing a connection in her earlier work with the state of her spiritual life.

In the Author's Note from Christ the Lord: Out of Egypt, Rice states:

I had experienced an old-fashioned, strict Roman Catholic childhood in the 1940s and 1950s … we attended daily Mass and Communion in an enormous and magnificently decorated church. … Stained-glass windows, the Latin Mass, the detailed answers to complex questions on good and evil—these things were imprinted on my soul forever. … I left this church at age 18. … I wanted to know what was happening, why so many seemingly good people didn't believe in any organized religion yet cared passionately about their behavior and value of their lives.... I broke with the church. … I wrote many novels without my being aware that they reflected my quest for meaning in a world without God.

In her memoir Called Out of Darkness: A Spiritual Confession, Rice stated:

In the moment of surrender, I let go of all the theological or social questions which had kept me from [God] for countless years. I simply let them go. There was the sense, profound and wordless, that if He knew everything I did not have to know everything, and that, in seeking to know everything, I'd been, all of my life, missing the entire point. No social paradox, no historic disaster, no hideous record of injustice or misery should keep me from Him. No question of Scriptural integrity, no torment over the fate of this or that atheist or gay friend, no worry for those condemned and ostracized by my church or any other church should stand between me and Him. The reason? It was magnificently simple: He knew how or why everything happened; He knew the disposition of every single soul. He wasn't going to let anything happen by accident! Nobody was going to go to Hell by mistake.

=== Leaving New Orleans ===
Rice announced that she had made plans to leave New Orleans on her website on January 18, 2004. She cited living alone since the death of her husband and her son moving to California as the reasons for her move. Rice put the largest of her three homes up for sale on January 30, 2004, and moved to a gated community in Kenner, Louisiana. "Simplifying my life, not owning so much, that's the chief goal", said Rice. "I'll no longer be a citizen of New Orleans in the true sense." She sold two New York City condominiums in March and April 2005. After completing Christ the Lord: Out of Egypt, Rice left New Orleans in 2005 shortly before the events of Hurricane Katrina in August. None of her former New Orleans properties were flooded, and Rice remained a vocal advocate for the city and related relief projects.

=== California ===
After leaving New Orleans, Rice first settled in La Jolla, California, describing the weather there as "like heaven" in November 2005. She left La Jolla less than a year after moving there, stating in January 2006 that the weather was too cold. She purchased a six-bedroom home in Rancho Mirage, California in late 2005 and moved there in 2006, allowing her to be closer to her son in Los Angeles.

Rice auctioned off her large collection of antique dolls at Thierault's in Chicago on July 18, 2010. Rice also auctioned off her wardrobe, jewelry, household possessions and collectibles featured in her many books on eBay starting in mid-2010 through early 2011. She sold a large portion of her library collection to Powell's Books.

=== Distancing from Christianity ===
Rice publicly announced her disdain for the existing state of Christianity on her Facebook page on July 28, 2010:

Today I quit being a Christian. … I remain committed to Christ as always but not to being 'Christian' or to being part of Christianity. It's simply impossible for me to 'belong' to this quarrelsome, hostile, disputatious, and deservedly infamous group. For ten years, I've tried. I've failed. I'm an outsider. My conscience will allow nothing else.

Shortly thereafter, she clarified her statement:

My faith in Christ is central to my life. My conversion from a pessimistic atheist lost in a world I didn't understand, to an optimistic believer in a universe created and sustained by a loving God is crucial to me. But following Christ does not mean following His followers. Christ is infinitely more important than Christianity and always will be, no matter what Christianity is, has been, or might become.

Following her announcement, Rice's critique of Christianity was commented upon by numerous journalists and pundits. In an interview with the Los Angeles Times, Rice elaborated on her view regarding being a member of a Christian church: "I feel much more morally comfortable walking away from organized religion. I respect that there are all kinds of denominations and all kinds of churches, but it's the entire controversy, the entire conversation that I need to walk away from right now." In response to the question, "How do you follow Christ without a church?" Rice replied: "I think the basic ritual is simply prayer. It's talking to God, putting things in the hands of God, trusting that you're living in God's world and praying for God's guidance. And being absolutely faithful to the core principles of Jesus' teachings." Rice participated in the "I Am Second" project in 2010 with a short documentary about her spiritual journey. Rice stated that she was a secular humanist in a Facebook post on April 14, 2013. She said that Christ was still central to her life, but not in the way he is presented by organized religion, in a July 28, 2014, Facebook post.

In a later interview with Alice Cooper, she stated:

My faith lives in my novels, of course. It lives in every word I write. It lives in my novels about Jesus. Though I've moved away from institutional Christianity and organized religion — and all its theological strife — my devotion to Jesus remains fierce. My faith blazes in my vampire novels, and in The Witching Hour series, and even in the erotica I've written. I believe that people are basically good as Anne Frank put it; I believe the creation is basically good and beautiful; I believe that sex is beautiful and good. I believe our capacity to love, to know pleasure, to want to live lives of meaning — all this reflects the existence of a loving and personal Creator. I dream of all things human being reconciled in our ethical institutions and moral institutions; I dream of all of us being redeemed in every way. This is why the story of the Incarnation is so important to me, the story of Jesus being born amongst us, growing up amongst us, working and sweating and struggling as we do, and dying amongst us before he rose from the dead and ascended into Heaven. I write about outsiders seeking redemption in one form or another and always will.

== Death ==
Rice died from complications of a stroke at a hospital in Rancho Mirage, California, on December 11, 2021, at the age of 80. According to a statement from Rice's son Christopher Rice, the family planned to inter her at the family mausoleum at Metairie Cemetery in New Orleans.

Rice was laid to rest in January 2022. The Rice Family Mausoleum is also the burial site of Rice's husband Stan Rice and daughter Michele. One side of the tomb is stained glass, the other three sides are engraved with Stan Rice's poems from his books "False Prophet" and "Some Lamb". The mausoleum is open to the public during visiting hours.

== Bibliography ==
=== Novels ===
==== The Vampire Chronicles universe ====
The Vampire Chronicles series:

1. Interview with the Vampire (1976), ISBN 9780394498218
2. The Vampire Lestat (1985), ISBN 9781127490400
3. The Queen of the Damned (1988), ISBN 9780394558233
4. The Tale of the Body Thief (1992), ISBN 9780679405283
5. Memnoch the Devil (1995), ISBN 9780679441014
6. The Vampire Armand (1998), ISBN 9780679454472
7. Merrick (2000) (*), ISBN 9780679454489
8. Blood and Gold (2001), ISBN 9780679454496
9. Blackwood Farm (2002) (*), ISBN 9780345443687
10. Blood Canticle (2003) (*), ISBN 9780375412004
11. Prince Lestat (2014), ISBN 9780307962522
12. Prince Lestat and the Realms of Atlantis (2016), ISBN 9780385353793
13. Blood Communion: A Tale of Prince Lestat (2018), ISBN 9781524732646

New Tales of the Vampires series:

1. Pandora (1998), ISBN 9780375401596
2. Vittorio the Vampire (1999), ISBN 9780375401602

Lives of the Mayfair Witches series:

1. The Witching Hour (1990), ISBN 9780394587868
2. Lasher (1993), ISBN 9780679412953
3. Taltos (1994), ISBN 9780679425731

(*) Merrick, Blackwood Farm and Blood Canticle are crossovers with the Lives of the Mayfair Witches series

==== Ramses the Damned ====
1. The Mummy, or Ramses the Damned (1989), ISBN 9780345360007
2. Ramses the Damned: The Passion of Cleopatra (2017), with Christopher Rice, ISBN 9781101970324
3. Ramses the Damned: The Reign of Osiris (2022), with Christopher Rice, ISBN 9781524732646

==== Christ the Lord ====
1. Christ the Lord: Out of Egypt (2005), ISBN 9780375412011
2. Christ the Lord: The Road to Cana (2008), ISBN 9780676978070

==== Songs of the Seraphim ====
1. Angel Time (2009), ISBN 9781400043538
2. Of Love and Evil (2010), ISBN 9780676978094

==== The Wolf Gift Chronicles ====
1. The Wolf Gift (2012), ISBN 9780307595119
2. The Wolves of Midwinter (2013), ISBN 9780385349963

==== The Sleeping Beauty Quartet (under the pseudonym A. N. Roquelaure) ====
1. The Claiming of Sleeping Beauty (1983), ISBN 9780452266568
2. Beauty's Punishment (1984), ISBN 9780525484585
3. Beauty's Release (1985), ISBN 9780452266636
4. Beauty's Kingdom (2015), ISBN 9780525427995

==== Stand-alones ====
- The Feast of All Saints (1979), ISBN 9780671247553
- Cry to Heaven (1982), ISBN 9780385121675
- Servant of the Bones (1996), ISBN 9780676970036
- Violin (1997), ISBN 9780679433026

===== Erotica under the pseudonym Anne Rampling =====
- Exit to Eden (1985), ISBN 9780877956099
- Belinda (1986), ISBN 9780877958260

=== Short stories ===
- "October 4, 1948", Transfer 19, 1965. Reprinted in The Anne Rice Reader, Katherine Ramsland, ed., 1997
- "Nicholas and Jean", Transfer 21, June 1966. Reprinted in The Anne Rice Reader, Katherine Ramsland, ed., 1997
- "The Art of the Vampire at Its Peak in the Year 1876, or, Armand's Lesson" (Playboy, January 1979)
- "The Master of Rampling Gate", Redbook, February 1984

=== Non-fiction ===
- Called Out of Darkness: A Spiritual Confession (2008), ISBN 9780307388483, autobiography

== Awards ==
| Year | Award | Category | Work | Result | Ref. |
|---|---|---|---|---|---|
| 1977 | British Fantasy Award | August Derleth Award | Interview with the Vampire | Nominated | |
| 1986 | World Fantasy Award | Novel | The Vampire Lestat | Nominated | |
| 1986 | Locus Award | Fantasy Novel | The Vampire Lestat | Nominated | |
| 1988 | Bram Stoker Award | Novel | The Queen of the Damned | Nominated | |
| 1989 | Locus Award | Horror Novel | The Queen of the Damned | Nominated | |
| 1991 | Locus Award | Horror/Dark Fantasy Novel | The Witching Hour | Won | |
| 1993 | Lambda Literary Award for Speculative Fiction | Gay Men's Science Fiction/Fantasy | The Tale of the Body Thief | Nominated | |
| 1993 | Locus Award | Horror/Dark Fantasy Novel | The Tale of the Body Thief | Nominated | |
| 1994 | Locus Award | Horror Novel | Lasher | Nominated | |
| 1994 | World Horror Convention Grand Master Award | | | Won | |
| 1995 | Locus Award | Horror/Dark Fantasy Novel | Taltos | Nominated | |
| 1996 | Locus Award | Horror/Dark Fantasy Novel | Memnoch the Devil | Nominated | |
| 1997 | Locus Award | Horror/Dark Fantasy Novel | Servant of the Bones | Nominated | |
| 2001 | Lambda Literary Award for Speculative Fiction | Horror/Science Fiction/Fantasy | Merrick | Nominated | |
| 2004 | Bram Stoker Award | Lifetime Achievement | | Won | |
| 2013 | International Thriller Writers Awards | "Thrillermaster" award | | Won | |
| 2013 | Goodreads Choice Awards | Horror | The Wolves of Midwinter | Nominated | |
| 2014 | Goodreads Choice Awards | Horror | Prince Lestat | Won | |
| 2017 | Goodreads Choice Awards | Horror | Prince Lestat and the Realms of Atlantis | Nominated | |
| 2017 | Lord Ruthven Award | Fiction | Prince Lestat and the Realms of Atlantis | Won | |
| 2018 | Goodreads Choice Awards | Horror | The Passion of Cleopatra | Nominated | |

== Adaptations ==
=== Film ===
The 1994 film Exit to Eden, based loosely on the book Rice published as Anne Rampling, stars Rosie O'Donnell and Dan Aykroyd. The work was transformed from a BDSM-themed love story into a police comedy, and was widely considered a box-office failure, receiving near-universal negative reviews.

Also in 1994, Neil Jordan directed a motion picture adaptation of Interview with the Vampire, based on Rice's own screenplay. The movie starred Tom Cruise as the mercurial Lestat, Brad Pitt as the guilt-ridden Louis, and a young Kirsten Dunst in her breakout role as the deceitful child vampire Claudia.

A second film adaptation of The Vampire Chronicles, Queen of the Damned, was released in February 2002, starring Stuart Townsend as the vampire Lestat and singer Aaliyah as Akasha. The movie combined plot points from both the novel The Queen of the Damned, as well as from The Vampire Lestat. Produced on a budget of $35 million, the film recouped only $30 million at the U.S. box office. On her Facebook page, Rice distanced herself from the film, and stated that she feels the filmmakers "mutilated" her work in adapting the novel.

A film adaptation of Christ the Lord: Out of Egypt was reported to be in the early stages of development in February 2012. It was reported that Chris Columbus had signed on to produce, and that Cyrus Nowrasteh had already completed the script. On November 8, 2014, during an interview with her long-time editor, Victoria Wilson, at the Chicago Humanities Festival, Rice revealed that filming had finished on the movie and was going into post-production. The film, titled The Young Messiah, was released in 2016.

In August 2014, Universal Pictures had acquired the rights to Rice's Vampire Chronicles. In November 2016, when Universal Pictures did not renew the contract, the film and television rights reverted to Rice, who began developing The Vampire Chronicles into a television series with her son, Christopher.

=== Television ===
In 1997, Rice wrote the story for a television pilot entitled Rag and Bone, featuring elements of both horror and crime fiction. Screenwriter James D. Parriott penned the screenplay, and the pilot ultimately aired on CBS, starring Dean Cain and Robert Patrick.

Earth Angels was a presentation pilot written by Rice, produced by Imagine Television and 20th Century Fox Television, and picked up by NBC. Set in New York City, it followed angels in human form battling against evil. Four parts of Anne Rice's story treatment for the series were published in 1999 as a bonus in the comic book series called Anne Rice's Tale of the Body Thief.

The Feast of All Saints was made into a Showtime original miniseries in 2001, directed by Peter Medak and starring James Earl Jones and Gloria Reuben. As of 2002, NBC had plans to adapt Rice's Lives of the Mayfair Witches trilogy into a miniseries, but the project never entered production.

In November 2016, Rice announced on Facebook that the rights to her novels had reverted to her despite earlier plans for other adaptations. Rice said that she and her son, author Christopher Rice, would be developing and executive producing a potential television series based on the novels. In April 2017, they teamed up with Paramount Television and Anonymous Content to develop a series. As of early 2018, Bryan Fuller was involved with the creation of a potential TV series based on the novels. On July 17, 2018, it was announced that the series was in development at streaming service Hulu and that Fuller had departed the production. As of December 2019, Hulu's rights had expired and Rice was shopping a package including all film and TV rights to the series. In May 2020, it was announced that AMC had acquired the rights to The Vampire Chronicles and Lives of the Mayfair Witches for developing film and television projects. Anne and Christopher Rice were to serve as executive producers on any projects developed. The Immortal Universe, a media franchise and shared universe based on the works on Anne, began in 2022.

- Interview with the Vampire (2022), series created by Rolin Jones, based on the novel Interview with the Vampire
- Mayfair Witches (2023), series created by Michelle Ashford and Esta Spalding, based on series of novels Lives of the Mayfair Witches
- The Talamasca (2025)

=== Theatre ===
On April 25, 2006, the musical Lestat, based on Rice's Vampire Chronicles books, opened at the Palace Theatre on Broadway after having its world premiere and preview run at the Curran Theatre in San Francisco, California, in December 2005. With music by Elton John and lyrics by Bernie Taupin, it was the inaugural production of the newly established Warner Brothers Theatre Ventures. Despite Rice's own overwhelming approval and praise, the show received disappointing attendance and largely negative reviews from critics. Lestat closed a month later on May 28, 2006, after just 33 previews and 39 regular performances. The release of the cast recording of the show is reportedly on hold indefinitely.

=== Comics and manga ===
Several of Anne Rice's novels have been adapted into comic books and manga. Adaptations include:

- Anne Rice's The Vampire Lestat #1–12 by Innovation Comics (1990–1991), compiled into one volume by Ballantine Books (1991)
- Anne Rice's The Mummy or Ramses the Damned #1–12 by Millennium Publications (1990–1992)
- Anne Rice's The Queen of the Damned #1–11 (#12 was never published) by Innovation Comics (1991)
- Anne Rice's The Master of Rampling Gate (one-shot) by Innovation Comics (1991)
- Anne Rice's The Vampire Companion #1–3 by Innovation Comics (1991)
- Anne Rice's Interview with the Vampire #1–12 by Innovation Comics (1991–1994)
- Anne Rice's The Witching Hour #1–13 by Millennium Publications (1992–1993), #1–3 compiled into Anne Rice's The Witching Hour: The Beginning by Millennium Publications (1994)
- Yoake No Vampire (夜明けのヴァンパイア) by Animage (1995)
- Anne Rice's The Tale of the Body Thief #1–4 (numbers 5–12 were never published) by Sicilian Dragon (1999), completed in one volume by Sicilian Dragon (2000)
- Anne Rice's Servant of the Bones #1–6 by IDW Publishing (2011), compiled into one volume by IDW (2012)
- Interview with the Vampire: Claudia's Story by Yen Press (2012)
- The Wolf Gift: The Graphic Novel by Yen Press (2014)

=== Fan fiction ===
Rice initially expressed an adamant stance against fan fiction based on her works, and particularly in opposition to such fiction based on The Vampire Chronicles, releasing a statement in 2000 that disallowed all such efforts, citing copyright issues. She subsequently requested that FanFiction.Net remove stories featuring her characters. In 2012, Metro reported that Rice developed a milder stance on the issue. "I got upset about 20 years ago because I thought it would block me", she said. "However, it's been very easy to avoid reading any, so live and let live. If I were a young writer, I'd want to own my own ideas. But maybe fan fiction is a transitional phase: whatever gets you there, gets you there."

== See also ==
- List of bestselling novels in the United States
- List of best-selling fiction authors
