= Angel Time =

Novel by Anne Rice

- First edition cover
- Author: Anne Rice
- Language: English
- Published: October 27, 2009
- Publisher: Knopf
- Publication place: United States
- Media type: Print (Paperback & Hardback)
- Pages: 288 pp (first edition)
- ISBN: 978-1-4000-4353-8
- OCLC: 303038757
- Dewey Decimal: 813/.54 22
- LC Class: PS3568.I265 A84 2009
- Followed by: Of Love and Evil

Angel Time is a novel by American author Anne Rice released on October 27, 2009. The book is the first in Rice's Songs of the Seraphim series, which tells the story of Toby O'Dare, an assassin with a tragic past. The author's inspiration for the book, and the primary setting for the beginning of the story, is the Mission Inn in Riverside, California, a large historic Mission Revival style hotel. The book debuted on the November 15, 2009 New York Times Bestseller list at #13.

== Television adaptation ==
It was announced in late September 2013 that American network CBS would adapt the novel into a television series. Rice herself was to serve as an executive producer for the project along with Carl Beverly and Sarah Timberman. The project was to be produced under their production company, Timberman-Beverly Prods., and written by Josh Harto and Liz Garcia.

== See also ==
- "Æviternity", the Scholastic concept of "Angel Time"
