= The Wolves of Midwinter =

Book by Anne Rice

- Author: Anne Rice
- Language: English
- Subject: Werewolves
- Genre: Gothic fiction, horror fiction, werewolf fiction
- Published: October 15, 2013
- Publisher: Random House
- Publication place: United States
- ISBN: 978-0-385-34996-3
- Preceded by: The Wolf Gift

The Wolves of Midwinter is a 2013 novel written by gothic fiction novelist Anne Rice and is the second book in her series The Wolf Gift Chronicles. It debuted at number 14 on The New York Times Best Seller list for print and E-book fiction and number 9 on the Hardcover Fiction list.

== Background ==
The series as a whole was first inspired by Jeff Eastin after he sent an email to Rice, who stated that "he had seen a special on werewolves and if I ever decided to tackle the subject he would certainly buy the book and for some reason he just said that at the right time". The dedication in The Wolf Gift to Eastin is due to this instigation. Rice stated that The Wolf Gift was originally meant to be a standalone book that had a full story. Despite not having the intention for it to be a series, she found that she "wanted to continue it because I loved the characters and I loved the whole story", leading to the creation of The Wolves of Midwinter. She commented that she intended to write a third book in the series as well.

The setting of the book is meant to emulate the home and atmosphere of the Madewood Plantation House, which Rice visited in the late 1980's for their Christmas party. Millie Ball, the owner of the plantation, is included in the book's dedication as well.

== Critical reception ==
NPR reviewer Alan Cheuse noted that while "the dialogue now and then seems a little stilted", they nonetheless "really enjoyed watching Rice create yet another world of strangeness and transformations along the lines of her greatest achievements". Elizabeth Hand, writing for The Washington Post, criticized the novel for offering "intriguing glimpses of the ancient history of the Morphenkinder and a tantalizing promise of darker revelations to come", yet ultimately involving a plot that is "only a series of setpieces and occasional supernatural intrusions, all too neatly resolved" that creates a written universe where "evildoers disappear down the hatch without a trace, ghosts natter on in sappy New Age-speak, and even the werewolves have been metaphorically defanged".

Kirkus Reviews summed up the novel as a "complex fantasy world [that] relies on an elaborate substructure of lore and history, and the action slows as points of exposition are repetitiously belabored". A review in Publishers Weekly also pointed out that "new conflicts and antagonists are introduced and dealt with in a late rush, and Reuben’s forays as Man Wolf are perfunctory, taking up fewer pages than the party planning", but also stated that the book is "not without charm", especially due to its "sympathetic protagonists" and that the "series mythology, suggesting that the fair folk may be evolved human ghosts, is fascinating".
