= Of Love and Evil =

2010 novel by Anne Rice

- First edition
- Author: Anne Rice
- Language: English
- Published: November 30, 2010
- Publisher: Knopf
- Publication place: United States
- Media type: Print (Paperback & Hardback)
- Pages: 192
- ISBN: 0-676-97809-6
- Preceded by: Angel Time

Of Love and Evil is a fantasy novel by American author Anne Rice, part of her Songs of the Seraphim series, which tells the story of Toby O'Dare, an assassin with a tragic past. The book received a 2011 Christianity Today Book Award.

== Plot summary ==
Toby O'Dare, former government assassin, is summoned by the angel Malchiah to 15th century Rome to solve a crime of poisoning and to uncover the secrets of an earthbound restless spirit, a dybbuk. Toby is plunged into the past as a lutist sent to handle the spirit. He discovers himself in the midst of dark plots and counterplots, with a dangerous ecclesiastical threat closing in around him. As he embarks on a journey of atonement, he is reconnected with his own past.
