= Violin (novel) =

1997 novel by Anne Rice

- First edition
- Author: Anne Rice
- Cover artist: Guido Reni
- Language: English
- Genre: Horror
- Published: October 15, 1997
- Publisher: Knopf
- Publication place: United States
- Pages: 289
- ISBN: 0-679-43302-3
- OCLC: 42396768

Violin is a novel by American horror writer Anne Rice, released on 15 October 1997. It moves away from her previous stories about vampires and witches to tell a ghost story. Despite the novel's paranormal contents, many reviewers noted that it closely mirrors Rice's lived experiences.

== Plot summary ==
The book is set in numerous places, including Vienna, New Orleans and Rio de Janeiro. The novel tells the story of three people: a middle-aged woman yearning to become a musician, a ghostly violinist, and the ghost of Beethoven.

The story begins with Triana, who apparently becomes insane due to the death of her second husband, Karl, who had AIDS. Her first husband was Lev, with whom Triana had a daughter. Stefan, the ghost, appears the day Karl dies and plays his Stradivarius (s long Strad) (apparently also a ghost). Triana secludes herself in her house for several days without informing anyone of Karl's death.

The book tells the story of both Triana and Stefan. Stefan takes Triana in a travel through time, visiting scenes from his life and his afterlife in an attempt to reclaim his violin, which had been taken by Triana. Stefan had many mentors including Beethoven and Paganini, but it is Beethoven whom Stefan cherished the most. After Stefan's story is "told" Triana returns to her rightful time but not to New Orleans where the story began but to Vienna, and now seemingly possessing a talent to improvise in the violin.

The ghost of this great musician is shown about two times in the novel, the first one in a scene where Stefan's house in Vienna is burning, and the second one almost at the end where Beethoven appears in modern Vienna in the hotel room where Triana was staying.

With Triana still in possession of the strad, Stefan continues his attempts to reclaim the violin but to no avail, until finally, after achieving success with her improvisations it is in Brazil that Triana returns the violin to his rightful owner and Stefan finally crosses over.

== Reception ==
Despite the novel's paranormal contents, many reviewers noted that it closely mirrors Rice's lived experiences.As The Clarion-Ledger's J. C. Patterson wrote, "The facts are real. Only the names and events have been altered."

Joy Dickinson, writing for The Times, similarly discussed how many of Rice's books contain snippets from her own life. In Violin, Dickinson contends, Rice includes herself more directly, such as when the narrator, Triana, "explains that her name means 'three Annes'", significant in that Rice has written under three pseudonyms with the name Anne. Dickinson concludes that "almost everything about the story echoes Anne Rice's life," excepting the husband's death, given that Rice's husband "is still very much alive".

While some reviewers provided a positive review, The Fresno Bee's James S. Howard called the novel "a sour note" in Rice's catalog. Howard called the characters "uninteresting, the story absurd and the writing embarrassing", concluding that "''Violin'' is more than disappointing. It is an offensive waste of time." In another pan review, The Macon Telegraph's Andrew Fleming stated that readers have "to wade through the 150 pages to get to the good part -- and the good part is no prize winner". Fleming explained that "the tawdry pace and irritating attention to architectural details drag the book down", concluding that "Hardcore Anne Rice may like this garbage, but when others finish the last page, they will probably want to follow my example and throw the book across the room".
