= Christ the Lord: Out of Egypt =

2005 novel by Anne Rice

- First edition
- Author: Anne Rice
- Cover artist: anonymous, (Funeral Portrait, Pushkin Museum)
- Language: English
- Published: 2005
- Publisher: Knopf
- Publication place: United States
- Media type: Print (Paperback & Hardback)
- Pages: 384
- ISBN: 0-375-41201-8
- Followed by: Christ the Lord: The Road to Cana

Christ the Lord: Out of Egypt (2005) is a book by American writer Anne Rice, which depicts the life of Jesus Christ at the age of 7 to 8, loosely based on the apocryphal text The Infancy Gospel of Thomas. Rice wrote the novel after returning to the Catholic Church in 1998.

== Reviews ==
Beliefnet named Christ the Lord: Out of Egypt its 2005 Book of the Year on the basis of its "creativity, its unique spin on one of the world's most important religious figures, and for its impact on Christians and other readers". Janet Maslin of The New York Times said "The restraint and prayerful beauty of Christ the Lord is apt to surprise Rice's normal readers and attract new ones". Lev Grossman of Time said "This is in fact an intensely literal historical, reverent treatment of a year in the life of Jesus, written in simple, sedate language".

== Film ==
A film based on the book was scheduled to start shooting in October 2007 in Israel, produced by David Kirkpatrick, co-founder of Good News Holdings. The production company hoped to release the film in the Fall of 2008. However, the project was cancelled due to "creative differences".

Rice announced that a new development for a film adaptation, The Young Messiah, was underway. It was being written and directed by Cyrus Nowrasteh. FilmDistrict at first acquired the U.S. distribution rights, but distribution shifted to Focus Features. According to Rice, production was slated to begin in Fall 2014 in Rome, Italy, with the film's tentative release date set for March 23, 2016.

Production commenced on September 11, 2014, in Matera, Italy, and concluded sometime before November. The film was released in the U.S. on March 11, 2016.

== Follow-up books ==
The second book in the series, The Road to Cana, was published in 2008.

While answering questions at the 2012 New York Comic-Con, Rice confirmed that she had no intention of developing a third book due to the potential controversy it might generate.
