= Servant of the Bones =

1996 novel by Anne Rice

- First edition
- Author: Anne Rice
- Language: English
- Genre: Historical, Horror novel
- Published: July 29, 1996
- Publisher: Knopf
- Publication place: United States
- Media type: Print (Hardback & Paperback)
- Pages: 387
- ISBN: 978-0676970036
- OCLC: 438534804
- Dewey Decimal: 813/.54 20
- LC Class: PS3568.I265 S47 1996

Servant of the Bones (1996) is a historical horror novel by Anne Rice.

== Plot introduction ==
Servant of the Bones is an account of the creation and subsequent existence of a genie, Azriel. It is a story told as a fireside chat and includes historical accounts of Azriel's life as a displaced Jewish merchant's son in Babylon at the time of its conquest by Cyrus the Persian. There are also glimpses of life in ancient Miletus, in Strasbourg during a pogrom, and New York City of the 1990s.

=== Explanation of the novel's title ===
Throughout the novel, Azriel is struggling to understand whether he is a ghost, a demon, or an angel. He is trying to understand why God has denied him the Stairway to Heaven by allowing him to be made into an immortal spirit who is bound to the gold-encased bones of his mortal body. As a genie, he must obey the Master of those bones (whoever has them at the moment) and become the Master's Servant, whether for good or evil. Thus the title, Servant of the Bones.

== Plot summary ==
Azriel is telling the story of his transformation into and subsequent existence as an immortal genii who is forced to obey the Master who calls him. Over centuries, Azriel becomes less obedient to the Masters and a warning is placed on the casket of his bones that he is not to be summoned lest his evil be loosed upon the undeserving world.

After many centuries of rest, Azriel finds himself awake and in New York City, a dazed witness to the murder of a young woman, Esther Belkin. He becomes inexplicably obsessed with the desire to avenge her death and to find out who called him into the physical world in time to see Esther die but not in time to save her. This quest leads him to the girl's stepfather, Gregory Belkin, who would pay any price to fulfill his messianic dream via his immense worldwide religious organization, the Temple of the Mind of God.

As his quest approaches its climax, he risks his supernatural powers to forestall an attempt to destroy the world thus redeeming what was denied him for so long: his own eternal human soul.

== Characters ==
- Azriel: formerly a mortal young man of Babylon in 539 BC, now a spirit bound to obey whoever possesses his gold-encased mortal bones.
- Jonathan Ben Isaac: the history professor whom Azriel seeks to hear and write his tale.

=== In Babylon ===
- Aseneth: the witch who betrays Azriel and kills him in order to turn him into the Servant of the Bones. She dies before she is able to complete the ritual.
- Cyrus the Great or Cyrus the Persian: the man who conquered Babylon. Made a deal with Azriel that if Azriel became the new Marduk statue, all his people could return to the Holy Land and rebuild their temple.
- Marduk: a spirit who is worshiped as a Babylonian god. He befriends the mortal Azriel, and becomes his 'personal god' throughout his mortal existence. Sadly, Azriel's stunning resemblance to the statue of Marduk causes him to be chosen for the ceremony to create a new statue every one hundred years, thus inadvertently turning him into the Servant of the Bones.
- Nabonidus: the diseased king of Babylon

=== In Miletus ===
- Zurvan (using sometimes the alias Pablo Montes from the City of Hidalgo, Texas): the magus who becomes Azriel's first master and teacher. Azriel does not remember his time with Zurvan until 2000 years has passed and he awakes in New York, Zurvan's teachings of kindness and virtues stay with him throughout the centuries.

=== In France ===
- Samuel: a wealthy Jewish merchant. He made a deal with some Gentiles that he would give Azriel's bones to them to do what he pleased if they would bring his daughters to safety. Whether Azriel truly loved him in the end or not is a matter of debate, because the scene begins with Azriel begging Samuel to fly him away from the oncoming pogrom, but ends on a sad note with Azriel being forced back into the bones cursing his master for being a martyr. This begins Azriel's onslaught of all his subsequent masters.

=== In New York City ===
- Avram the Rebbe: Gregory's estranged Grandfather; a Jewish holy man and keeper of the Bones (although he never called upon Azriel).
- Esther Belkin: the girl who was assassinated on Gregory—her stepfather's—orders. Azriel is there to witness this, and for reasons he can't explain wants to get revenge for the girl he knew for only a few seconds.
- Gregory Belkin: founder and leader of the Temple of the Mind of God. Also owns a considerable commercial and merchanting empire. Uses Esther as a ploy to begin a worldwide genocide to bring world peace, with his Temple as the new world government. Although he likens himself to be the Messiah, Azriel groups him with Hitler and Stalin, saying he is an insane murderer. His idol is Alexander the Great.
- Rachel Belkin: Gregory's wife; dying of a terminal illness, she claims Gregory is poisoning her and begs Azriel to fly with her to Miami so she may die in her own home. Last few minutes of her life are spent having intercourse with Azriel.
- Billy Joel Eval: Eldest of the three Eval brothers who are the paid assassins of Esther.
- Nathan: Gregory's estranged identical twin is a diamond merchant in New York City; he met Esther by chance and told her of his familial connection to her stepfather, Gregory.

== Allusions/references to actual history ==
As a work of historical fiction, this novel has several characters who were real or from ancient mythologies: Alexander the Great, Cyrus, Marduk, Nabonidus, Pharaoh.

== Comic book adaptation ==
From 2011 to 2012, Servant of the Bones was adapted as a six-issue comic book miniseries by IDW Publishing, entitled Anne Rice's Servant of the Bones. The novel was adapted by writer Mariah McCourt.
