= Taltos (Rice novel) =

1994 novel by Anne Rice

- First edition cover of Taltos (1994)
- Author: Anne Rice
- Language: English
- Series: Lives of the Mayfair Witches
- Genre: Gothic; supernatural; horror; fantasy
- Publisher: Knopf
- Publication date: September 19, 1994
- Pages: 480
- ISBN: 0-679-42573-X
- Preceded by: Lasher

Taltos is a 1994 Gothic horror novel by Anne Rice, the third and final novel in the Lives of the Mayfair Witches trilogy, following Lasher (1993).

== Plot ==
Ashlar, the founder of a multi-million dollar toy corporation based in New York City, believes himself to be the last living Taltos. He is shocked to learn from his friend Samuel that a male Taltos has been seen in the glen of Donnelaith. Having buried Emaleth, Rowan exists in a semi-catatonic state. She walks, she bathes, she eats, but she does not speak and does not respond to those around her. Rowan is awakened by the news that Aaron, now excommunicated from the Talamasca and recently married into the Mayfair family, has been deliberately run over by a car. She makes plans with Michael to seek revenge on the Talamasca, who she believes are responsible for Aaron's death. Mona discovers that she is pregnant by Michael and, after Rowan gives her blessing, ecstatically shares the news with the family. Mona later discovers that her unborn child is a Taltos, a female she names Morrigan. She runs off with Mayfair cousin Mary Jane to Fontevrault, an old plantation sunken into the marsh that has been owned by a separate branch of the Mayfair family for generations. Mary Jane's grandmother, Dolly Jean, helps deliver the new Taltos. Mona names Morrigan the designee of the Mayfair legacy, and she and Mary Jane make plans for the future in case Rowan and Michael try to kill Morrigan.

In London, Michael and Rowan meet up with Yuri Stefano, a pupil and friend of Aaron who has also been excommunicated by the Talamasca. Through Yuri they meet the other Ashlar and his friend Samuel, who is one of the Little People of Donnelaith, dwarf-like Taltos who never fed on their mother's milk and were subsequently stunted. Ashlar kills Anton Marcus, the Superior General of the Talamasca, for his part in Aaron's death. Another Talamasca Scholar, Stuart Gordon, has been plotting with his pupils Marklin and Tommy to unite Ashlar with a female Taltos he has acquired. The excommunications of Aaron and Yuri, as well as Aaron's death, were a ruse perpetrated by Stuart to keep the men from interfering with his plans. Ashlar meets the female Taltos, Tessa, and disappoints Stuart with the news that Tessa is too advanced in age to bear children. Rowan uses her strong telepathic abilities to cause Stuart to have a fatal stroke. Yuri takes Tessa to the Talamasca, who welcome Tessa with open arms and punish Marklin and Tommy by burying them alive.

In New York, Ashlar tells Rowan and Michael the story of his long life. He explains that the Taltos once thrived peacefully on a tropical island north of the British Isles, where they had been since "The Time Before the Moon". The island's semi-active volcano reawakens, forcing the Taltos to flee south to the bitter cold of Scotland. They become hunter-gatherers, and occasionally see early humans, whom they sometimes keep as pets. The Taltos break off into different tribes and the largest of them, led by Ashlar, goes south to Somerset where they settle. Their peace is often disrupted by Celtic raids on the land. To adapt and live peacefully among humans, the Taltos become the Picts, and Ashlar their king. When Christianity comes to them in the form of St Columba, Ashlar converts with more than half his tribe. But there is a conflict between the Christians and non-Christians, and war ensues. Soon only five Taltos males are left, and they all become priests, including Ashlar. Several years later, he attempts to tell his story to a fellow priest, who believes the story is blasphemy. Ashlar is disillusioned, and goes on a pilgrimage, leaving Donnelaith forever.

Rowan and Michael return to New Orleans, where Michael is introduced to his daughter, Morrigan. He and Rowan accept Mona's decision to make Morrigan the designee. A frenzied Morrigan smells Ashlar on the gifts he has sent, just as he comes to the First Street house to visit. Morrigan rushes into his arms, and they run away together.

== Reception ==
Taltos debuted at No. 2 on The New York Times Best Seller list, and remained in that position for five weeks, spending a total of 16 weeks on the list. Publishers Weekly wrote that "cutting-edge gene mapping intertwines with ancient mysteries" in Taltos. Alexander Theroux of the Chicago Tribune called Taltos "a dark and intimidating mystery" and wrote that Rice "continues the dark epic of the Mayfair witches, her saga of the occult ... that takes us on temporal and spatial journeys back through the centuries, probing plots of corruption and innocence, mortality and immortality, good and evil. The genre goes back to the Gothic novels of Ann Radcliffe and Horace Walpole, the kind of books, with their creaking armor, salivating monks and thunderstorms, satirized by Thomas Love Peacock in his Crotchet Castle." Theroux wrote that, "because this is a novel that is empty of style and color, it is turgid with story. It is a cat's cradle of unrealized characters, 25 or so stick figures who say things and disappear and not only are never vivid but also are never described. Publishers Weekly also wrote, "Pulsing with a persistent sense of foreboding, the novel is soggy with meandering, atmospheric prose that verges on softcore porn."
