= Exit to Eden =

Novel by Anne Rice

- First edition cover
- Author: Anne Rampling
- Audio read by: Gillian Anderson, Gil Bellows
- Language: English
- Genre: Erotica, Romance
- Published: May 1985
- Publisher: Arbor House
- Publication date: May 1985
- Publication place: United States
- Media type: Print (Hardback)
- Pages: 336 pp
- ISBN: 0-87795-609-X
- OCLC: 11159573
- Dewey Decimal: 813/.54
- LC Class: PS3568.I265 E9 1985

Exit to Eden is a 1985 novel by Anne Rice, initially published under the pen name Anne Rampling, but subsequently under Rice's own name. The novel explores the subject of BDSM in romance novel form. The novel also brought attention to Rice's published works that differed from the type of writing she was better known for (e.g. Interview with the Vampire), such as her Sleeping Beauty series under yet another pen name.

== Synopsis ==
Lisa Kelly manages an isolated BDSM resort named The Club, which offers clients an exclusive setting in which they can experience the life of a Master or Mistress. Prospective submissive slaves, paid at the end of their term at Eden (which varies from six months to two years), are presented at auctions by trainers from across the world. As head female trainer and co-founder, Lisa gets the first pick of the new slaves and chooses Elliot Slater—with whom she shares immediate and undeniable chemistry that intensifies throughout their time together, eventually resulting in love.

== Film adaptation ==
The 1994 film adaptation was produced by Savoy Pictures, starring Dana Delany and Paul Mercurio in the roles of Lisa and Elliot. The plot was heavily rewritten by the studio, with new buddy cop characters played by Dan Aykroyd and Rosie O'Donnell. The film was panned by critics.
