= Christ the Lord: The Road to Cana =

2008 novel by Anne Rice

- Author: Anne Rice
- Language: English
- Published: 2008
- Publisher: Anchor Books
- Publication place: United States
- Media type: Print (hardback & paperback)
- Pages: 336 pp (first edition)
- Preceded by: Christ the Lord: Out of Egypt

Christ the Lord: The Road to Cana is a novel depicting the life of Jesus, written by Anne Rice and released in 2008. It is the sequel to Christ the Lord: Out of Egypt and was part of a proposed four-part series about the life of Jesus.

== Reviews ==
Publishers Weekly called the novel "beautifully observed ... culmination of an intimate family saga of love, sorrow and misunderstanding". In dealing with the issues of Jesus's early childhood, the reviewer said that "Rice undertakes a delicate balance: if it is possible to create a character that is simultaneously fully human and fully divine, as ancient Christian creeds assert, then Rice succeeds". David Kuo, writing for NPR, said: "The Road to Cana is a masterful book written by an extraordinary writer at the height of her powers."
