= The Feast of All Saints (novel) =

1979 novel by Anne Rice

- First edition cover
- Author: Anne Rice
- Language: English
- Genre: Historical fiction
- Published: January 16, 1979
- Publisher: Simon & Schuster
- Publication place: United States
- Media type: Print
- Pages: 571
- ISBN: 978-0671247553
- OCLC: 5171397

The Feast of All Saints is a historical novel by American author Anne Rice published in 1979 by Simon & Schuster.

== Plot summary ==
This novel is about the gens de couleur libres, or free people of color, who lived in New Orleans before the Civil War. The gens de couleur libres were the descendants of European settlers of Louisiana, particularly the French and Spanish and people of African descent. It was a common practice for the early Caucasian settlers to free their children by their slave mistresses. Their mistresses however, were not all enslaved, some were free women of color whose families had been free for several generations. The novel takes place in the 1840s, at which time there was a large population of free people of color living in New Orleans.

The story centers on Marcel, a young man who has one white parent and one parent who is half white and half black. His mother, Cecile, is the mistress of Philippe Ferronaire, a rich French plantation owner. Cecile has borne Ferronaire two children, Marcel and his sister Marie. Marie is very light skinned and able to pass as white, but Marcel, who is blonde and blue eyed, but with ethnic hair, features, and slightly darker skin, cannot. The other two major characters in this novel are Christophe, a famous author who returns from Paris to start a school for the young gens, and Anna Bella, Marcel's childhood friend. Anna Bella loves Marcel, but as he is unprepared to offer her marriage (and too young) she becomes the mistress of Vincent Dazincourt, who is the brother of Philippe Ferronaire's white wife. They have a child together, but split after Marcel, who had been expecting to be sent to Paris, learns that his father has betrayed him and wanders to his father's plantation to confront him. There, his father beats him and repudiates him. In disgrace, Marcel is sent to live with his aunt among many Creole planters on the Cane River. It is here that Marcel learns some of his (African Diasporan) history, including the Haitian Slave Revolt and the fact that his mother was stolen off the street by his adopted aunt during that time.

While Marcel is learning history, his father is in New Orleans drinking himself to death, which he eventually does, depriving the family of their source of income. Marie, who was set to marry Marcel's best friend Richard, is now told that she will follow in her mother's footsteps and take a white protector in order to get money for the family and send Marcel to Paris (Marcel is unaware of all of this). Marie confides this to her slave maid and half-sister, Lisette. Lisette is also Phillipe Ferronaire's daughter (which Marie does not know) and was promised her freedom by him, but as he did to Marcel, he reneged on his promise to her. In revenge, Lisette takes Marie to the house of a voodooiene, where she is drugged and raped by five men. Marcel comes home to find that his sister has been raped, Richard has been locked in the family attic (to prevent him from taking revenge on the men, and then, certainly, being tried and convicted of murder and executed) and Vincent Dazincourt has already confronted two of the men, challenged them to duels, and killed them.

The issue from Dazincourt's perspective is that the five men knew Marie's identity, and therefore knew that she was related by blood to the Ferronaire/Dazincourt family, but raped her anyway. The gens de couleur libre members of the extended family cannot avenge Marie's rape, but he can.

Marie takes refuge with a local madam, Dolly Rose. Lisette commits suicide to avoid Dazincourt's vengeance. Dazincourt finds and kills a third man in a duel, but the other two escape from New Orleans before he can call them out and kill them. Richard, who is finally let out of the attic, tells his family that he will marry Marie or face exile with her. The novel ends with Marie and Richard sailing to France (where they will stay until the gossip dies down) and Marcel deciding to become a photographer in order to earn his living (with the implication that once he has some success he will marry Anna Bella).

== Reception ==
The Free Lance–Star compared the novel to Interview with the Vampire and said: "[...] "The Feast of the All Saints [sic] is in many ways a disappointment to admirers of her earlier book, despite its many positive qualities." Kirkus Reviews wrote: "Interview with a Vampire's (1976) commercially tailored front-runner that also manages to find some fresh energy in an overworked genre."

== Adaptation ==
The Feast of All Saints was made into a television miniseries in 2001, directed by Peter Medak and starring James Earl Jones, Forest Whitaker, Ossie Davis, Ruby Dee, Eartha Kitt, Pam Grier, Ben Vereen, Jasmine Guy, Jennifer Beals, Robert Ri'chard, Gloria Reuben, Peter Gallagher, Daniel Sunjata, Jenny Levine, Rachel Luttrell, and Bianca Lawson.
